= List of acronyms: B =

This list contains acronyms, initialisms, and pseudo-blends that begin with the letter B.

For the purposes of this list:

- acronym = an abbreviation pronounced as if it were a word, e.g., SARS = severe acute respiratory syndrome, pronounced to rhyme with cars
- initialism = an abbreviation pronounced wholly or partly using the names of its constituent letters, e.g., CD = compact disc, pronounced cee dee
- pseudo-blend = an abbreviation whose extra or omitted letters mean that it cannot stand as a true acronym, initialism, or portmanteau (a word formed by combining two or more words).

(a) = acronym, e.g.: SARS – (a) severe acute respiratory syndrome
(i) = initialism, e.g.: CD – (i) compact disc
(p) = pseudo-blend, e.g.: UNIFEM – (p) United Nations Development Fund for Women
(s) = symbol (none of the above, representing and pronounced as something else; for example: MHz – megahertz)

Some terms are spoken as either acronym or initialism, e.g., VoIP, pronounced both as voyp and V-O-I-P. (Main list of acronyms)

- B – (s) Bel – Boron

== B0–9 ==
- B10 – (i) Ben 10
- B10: AF – (i) Ben 10: Alien Force
- B10: UA – (i) Ben 10: Ultimate Alien
- B2B – (i) Business-to-business electronic commerce
- B2C – (i) Business-to-consumer electronic commerce
- B2E – (i) Business-to-employee electronic commerce
- B2M – Business to many

== BA ==
- ba – (s) Bashkir language (ISO 639-1 code)
- Ba – (s) Barium
- BA –
  - (i) Bachelor of Arts
  - (s) Bahrain (FIPS 10-4 country code)
  - Bosnia and Herzegovina (ISO 3166 diagram)
  - (i) British Airways
  - British Army
  - Bank of America
- BAA – (i) British Airport Authority
- BAC – (a) Blood alcohol content
  - British Aircraft Corporation
- BAD – (HBO) Boxing After Dark
- BADD – (a) Battlefield Awareness and Data Dissemination
- BAE – (p) BAE Systems (formerly British Aerospace, BAe)
- BAFTA – (a) British Academy of Film and Television Arts
- BAI – (i) Battlefield Air Interdiction
- bak – (s) Bashkir language (ISO 639-2 code)
- BALCO – (p) Bay Area Laboratory Co-operative
- bam – (s) Bambara language (ISO 639-2 code)
- BAM –
  - (i) Business Activity Monitoring
  - (s) Bosnia and Herzegovina convertible mark (ISO 4217 currency code)
- BAMC – (i) Brooke Army Medical Center
- Banesto – (p) Banco Español de Crédito (Spanish, "Spanish Credit Bank")
- BANG – (a) Bits, Atoms, Neurons, Genes
- BAO – (i) Battlefield Air Operations
- BAOR – (i) British Army Of the Rhine
- B[a]P – (p) Benzo[a]pyrene
- BAR
  - (s) Barbados (IOC trigram, but not FIFA or ISO 3166)
  - (a) British American Racing
  - Browning Automatic Rifle
  - Buy-American Restrictions
- BARD – (a) Binational Agricultural Research and Development fund (between the US and Israel)
- BARDA – (a) Biomedical Advanced Research and Development Authority
- BART – (a) Bay Area Rapid Transit
- BAS – (i) Battalion Aid Station
- BASE – (a) Building, Antenna, Span, Earth (parachute from)
- BASF – (i) Badische Anilin und Soda Fabrik (Baden Aniline and Soda Factory, a German chemicals company)
- BASIC – (a) Beginner's All-purpose Symbolic Instruction Code (acronym was added later, originally it was simply Basic)
- BAT – (a/i) Basic Aid Training
  - (a) British American Tobacco, London, England
  - (a) British Antarctic Territory (overseas territory)
- BATF – (i) U.S. Bureau of Alcohol, Tobacco, and Firearms
- BATS –
  - (a) Behavior Analysis Training System
  - Bradley Advanced Training System
- BATTeRS – (a) Bisei Asteroid Tracking Telescope for Rapid Survey

== BB ==
- BB
  - (s) Barbados (ISO 3166 digram; FIPS 10-4 country code)
  - (i) Boys' Brigade (Christian youth organization)
  - Brigitte Bardot (actress)
  - Bumblebee
- BBB
  - (i) Better Business Bureau
  - Blood–brain barrier
  - (p/i) BoerBurgerBeweging (Dutch, "Farmer–Citizen Movement"; Dutch political party)
- BBC
  - (i) Breeding Bird Census
  - British Broadcasting Corporation
  - (i) Bumper to Back of Cab (trucking measurement)
- BBCOR – (i) Bat-ball coefficient of restitution (standard used for non-wood bats used in US college baseball)
- BBD
  - (s) Barbadian dollar (ISO 4217 currency code)
  - (a) Bowel Bladder Dysfunction
- BBL
  - (i) Be Back Later
  - (i) Brazilian Butt Lift
  - Bird Banding Laboratory
  - Big Bash League
  - British Basketball League
- BBN – (i) Bolt, Beranek and Newman
- BBOL – Blessing Ball of Light
- BBQ – (s) Barbecue
- BBS
  - (i) Breeding Bird Survey (North America)
  - Brigade/Battalion Battle Simulation
  - Bulletin Board System
- BBSRC – (i) U.K. Biotechnology and Biological Sciences Research Council
- BBVA – (i) Banco Bilbao Vizcaya Argentaria (Spanish bank)
- BBYO – B'nai B'rith Youth Organization

== BC ==
- BC
  - (i) Before Christ
  - Blind Copy (in emailers)
  - Boston College
  - (s) Botswana (FIPS 10-4 country code; from Bechuanaland)
  - British Columbia (postal symbol)
- BCA
  - (i) Bachelor of Computer Application
  - Black Coaches & Administrators
  - Body Composition Assessment (Part of US Navy fitness assessment)
- BCC – (i) Blind Carbon Copy
- BCCI
  - (i) Bank of Credit and Commerce International
  - Board of Control for Cricket in India
- BCD – (i) Binary-Coded Decimal
- BCE
  - (i) Banque centrale européenne (French, "European Central Bank")
  - Battlefield Co-ordination Element
  - BC Electric, a former name for BC Hydro
  - Before Common Era
- BCER – (i) British Columbia Electric Railway
- BCFG – (s) Patchy Fog (METAR Code)
- BCIS (fratricide avoidance system) – (i) Battlefield Combat Identification System
- BCLL – (a) Bibliography of Celtic Latin Literature
- BCOL – (i) British Columbia Railway
- BCPL – (i) Basic Combined Programming Language (progenitor of C)
- BCS
  - (i) Bachelor of Computer Science
  - Bardeen, Cooper, and Schrieffer superconduction theory
  - Bowl Championship Series (US college football)
- BCT – (i) Brigade Combat Team

== BD ==
- BD
  - (s) Bangladesh (ISO 3166 digram)
  - Bermuda (FIPS 10-4 territory code)
- BDA – (i) British Dental Association
- BDD
  - (i) Body Dysmorphic Disorder
  - British Defence Doctrine
- Bde – (s) Brigade
- BDFL – (i) Benevolent Dictator For Life
- BDI – (s) Burundi (ISO 3166 trigram)
- BDNF – (i) Brain-Derived Neurotrophic Factor
- BDO – (i) Battle Dress Overgarment
- BDOS – (a) Basic Disk Operating System; part of CP/M
- BDS
  - (i) – Bachelor of Dental Surgery
  - Boycott, Divestment and Sanctions, a movement advocating various boycotts of Israel in the context of the Arab–Israeli conflict
- BDSM – (i) Bondage and Discipline, Domination and Submission, Sadism and Masochism
- BDT
  - (s) Bangladeshi taka (ISO 4217 currency code)
  - (i) Bureau de développement des télécommunications (Telecommunication Development Bureau, became ITU-D)
- BDU – (i) Battle-Dress Uniform

== BE ==
- be – (s) Belarusian language (ISO 639-1 code)
- Be – (s) Beryllium
- BE – (s) Belgium (FIPS 10-4 country code; ISO 3166 digram)
- BEA
  - (i) Banque extérieure d'Algérie
  - British European Airways (ancestor of British Airways)
  - British Electricity Authority
- bel – (s) Belarusian language (ISO 639-2 code)
- BEL – (s) Belgium (ISO 3166 trigram)
- BEM – (i) British Empire Medal – Bug-Eyed Monster
- ben – (s) Bengali language (ISO 639-2 code)
- BEN – (s) Benin (ISO 3166 trigram)
- BEO – (i) Banquet Event Order
- BERC – (a) Business Environmental Resource Center
- BER – (i) Bit Error Rate
- BES
  - (i) Budget Estimate Submission
  - (s) Caribbean Netherlands (ISO 3166 trigram; from the entity's alternate name of Bonaire, Sint Eustatius and Saba)
- BESS – (i) Business, Education, and Social Sciences
- BET – (a/i) Black Entertainment Television
- BETS – (a) Bradley Embedded Training System
- BEV
  - (i) Battery electric vehicle
  - Black English Vernacular, a type of English spoken by many African Americans
  - Bundesamt für Eich- und Vermessungswesen (German: "Federal Office of Metrology and Surveying"), Austrian government agency

== BF ==
- BF – (s) The Bahamas (FIPS 10-4 country code) – Burkina Faso (ISO 3166 digram)
- b/f – (p) before
- BFA – (s) Burkina Faso (ISO 3166 trigram)
- BfArM – (i) Bundesinstitut für Arzneimittel und Medizinprodukte, German governmental institute for drugs and medical devices
- BFF – (i) Best Friends Forever
- BFI – (a) British Film Institute
- BFR – (a) Biennial flight review
- BFR – (i) Brominated Flame Retardant
- BFS – (s) Belfast International Airport (IATA airport code)
- BFSA – (i) Blue Force Situation Awareness
- BFT – (i) Blue Force Tracking
- BFX – (s) Bioinformatics

== BG ==
- bg – (s) Bulgarian language (ISO 639-1 code)
- BG – (s) Bangladesh (FIPS 10-4 country code) – (i) Battle Group – Body Guard – (s) Brigadier General – (s) Bulgaria (ISO 3166 digram)
- BGA – (i) Ball Grid Array – Brandy and Ginger Ale (alcoholic beverage)
- BGD – (s) Bangladesh (ISO 3166 trigram)
- BGN – (i) U.S. Board on Geographic Names – (s) Bulgarian lev (ISO 4217 currency code)
- BGR – (s) Bulgaria (ISO 3166 trigram)
- BGS – (i) Bristol Grammar School – British Geological Survey
- BGWG – (p) Battle Group Wargame (military simulation; "big wig")

== BH ==
- bh – (s) Bihari languages (ISO 639-1 code)
- Bh – (s) Bohrium
- BH
  - (s) Bahrain (ISO 3166 digram)
  - Belize (FIPS 10-4 country code)
- BHD – (s) Bahraini dinar (ISO 4217 currency code)
- BHR – (s) Bahrain (ISO 3166 trigram)
- BHS
  - (i) British Home Stores
  - (s) The Bahamas (ISO 3166 trigram)

== BI ==
- bi – (s) Bislami language (ISO 639-1 code)
- Bi – (s) Bismuth
- BI – (s) Burundi (ISO 3166 digram)
- BIAP – (a) Baghdad International Airport – (p) Biafran pound
- BICS – (i/a) Battlefield Information and Communication System
- BID – (i) bis in die (Latin, "twice a day")
- BIDST – (i) British Institute of Dental and Surgical Technologists
- BIF – (s) Burundian franc (ISO 4217 currency code)
- bih – (s) Bihari languages (ISO 639-2 code)
- BIH – (s) Bosnia and Herzegovina (ISO 3166 trigram)
- BIOS – (a) Basic Input/Output System – British Institute of Organ Studies
- BIP – (a) Battlefield Interoperability Programme (ancestor of MIP) – Broadcast incremental power algorithm
- bis – (s) Bislami language (ISO 639-2 code)
- BISEPS – (a) Battlefield Identification System Environment Performance Simulation
- BIST – (a) Built-In Self-Test
- BIT – (a) Bilateral Investment Treaty – Built-In Test
- BITE – (a) Built-In Test Equipment

== BJ ==
- BJ – (s) Benin (ISO 3166 digram) – (i) Blowjob (oral sex)
- BJJ – (i) Brazilian Jiu-Jitsu
- BJP – (i) Bharatiya Janata Party (Indian People's Party)
- BJT – (i) Bipolar Junction Transistor

== BK ==
- Bk – (s) Berkelium
- BK
  - (i) Burger King
  - (p) Bankrupt (most often seen as "gone BK")
  - (s) Bosnia and Herzegovina (FIPS 10-4 country code)
- BKN – (s) Broken Sky (METAR Code)

== BL ==
- BL
  - (s) Bolivia (FIPS 10-4 country code)
  - (i) British Leyland
- BLCSE – (i) Battle Laboratory Constructive Simulation Environment
- BLDU – (s) Blowing Dust (METAR Code)
- BLEVE – (a) Boiling Liquid Expanding Vapour Explosion ("blevy")
- BLK – (i) Basket Liga Kobiet (Polish, "Women's Basketball League")
- BLM
  - (a) Black Lives Matter
  - Bureau of Land Management (U.S.)
- BLOB – (p) Binary Large OBject
- BLR – (s) Belarus (ISO 3166 trigram)
- BLSA – (s) Blowing Sand (METAR Code)
- BLRSI – Battle Lab Reconfigurable Simulator (U.S. Army)
- BLSN – (s) Blowing Snow (METAR Code)
- BLT – (i) Bacon Lettuce Tomato (sandwich)
- BLUFOR – (p) Blue Force(s) (military)
- BLUI – (a/i) Body Language User Interface ("blooie")
- BLW – (s) Below (METAR Code)
- BLZ – (s) Belize (ISO 3166 trigram)

== BM ==
- bm – (s) Bambara language (ISO 639-1 code)
- BM – (i) Battle Management – (s) Bermuda (ISO 3166 digram) – Myanmar (FIPS 10-4 country code; from Burma)
- BMA – (i) British Medical Association
- BMCC – (i) Borough of Manhattan Community College
- BMD – (i) Ballistic Missile Defence – (s) Bermudian dollar (ISO 4217 currency code) – (i) Boyevaya Mashina Desanta (Russian Боевая Машина Десанта, "Combat Vehicle Airborne") † – British Military Doctrine
- BMDG – (i) British Military Doctrine Group
- BMDO – (i) (U.S.) Ballistic Missile Defense Organization ("bim-do")
- BME – (p) Biomedical Engineering – (i) Black and Minority Ethnic group – Body Modification E-zine
- BMEWS – (a/i) Ballistic Missile Early Warning System ("bee-mews")
- BMI – (i) Body Mass Index – Broadcast Music Incorporated - British Midland International
- BMG – (i) Bertelsmann Music Group
- BML – (i) Battle Management Language
- BMNT – (i) Begin Morning Nautical Twilight
- BMP – (i) Boyevaya Mashina Pekhoti (Russian Боевая Машина Пехоты, "Combat Vehicle for the Infantry") †
- BMR – (i) Basal metabolic rate – Bronirovannaya Mashina Razminirovaniya (Russian Бронированная Машина Разминирования, "Armoured Vehicle for Mine-Clearing") †
- BMU – (s) Bermuda (ISO 3166 trigram)
- BMW – (i) Bayerische Motoren Werke (German, "Bavarian Motor Works")
- BMX – (i) Bicycle/Bike Moto (r) Cross

== BN ==
- bn – (s) Bengali language (ISO 639-1 code)
- Bn – (s) Battalion
- BN
  - (s) Brunei (ISO 3166 digram; FIPS 10-4 country code)
  - (i) Barisan Nasional (Malaysia)
  - (i) Burlington Northern
- BND – (s) Brunei dollar (ISO 4217 currency code)
- BnF – (i) Bibliothèque nationale de France (French, "National Library of France")
- BNF
  - (i) Backus–Naur form (computing)
  - British National Formulary
- BNICE – (a) Biological, Nuclear, Incendiary, Chemical, and Explosive Agents
- BNP
  - (i) British National Party
  - Banque Nationale de Paris, a predecessor to today's BNP Paribas
- BNS – (i) Scotiabank, formerly Bank of Nova Scotia
- BNSF – (i/s) Burlington Northern Santa Fe (also AAR reporting mark)

== BO ==
- bo – (s) Tibetan language (ISO 639-1 code)
- BO
  - (i) Back Orifice
  - (i) Baltimore and Ohio Railroad
  - (s) Belarus (FIPS 10-4 country code)
  - (i) Biarritz Olympique (French rugby union club)
  - (s) Bolivia (ISO 3166 digram)
  - (i) Body odor
- BO2k – (i) Back Orifice 2000
- BOAC – (i) British Overseas Airways Corporation (predecessor of British Airways)
- BoAML – Bank of America Merrill Lynch
- BOAT – (p) Byway Open to All Traffic (pronounced as two syllables, "Bo-At")
- BOB – (s) boliviano (ISO 4217 currency code) - Bank One Ballpark
- BOBFOC – (a) Body Off Baywatch, Face Off Crimewatch (description)
- BOBFOK – (a) Body of Barbie, face of Ken (description)
- BOC
  - (i) British Orthodontic Society
  - BOC
- BÖC – (i) Blue Öyster Cult
- bod – (s) Tibetan language (ISO 639-2 code)
- BOD – (i) Biochemical Oxygen Demand
- BODMAS – (a) Brackets, Orders, Division, Multiplication, Addition, Subtraction
- BOFH – (i) Bastard Operator From Hell
- BOGA – (a) Bend Over and Grab Ankles
- BOGOF – (a) Buy One, Get One Free
- BOGSAT – (a) Bunch Of Guys Sitting Around a Table
- BOHICA – (a) Bend Over Here It Comes Again
- BOI
  - (i) Balance Of Investment
  - Basis Of Issue
- BOL – (s) Bolivia (ISO 3166 trigram)
- BOM
  - (a) Base Object Model
  - Bill Of Materials
  - Block of the Month quilting term
  - Business opportunity meeting
- BOP (more than 20 alternatives)
  - (i) Balance of Payments
- BOPB – (i) Biarritz Olympique Pays Basque (the complete name of the rugby club)
- BOPD – (i) Barrel of Oil Per Day
- BOQ
  - (i) Bill Of Quotations
  - Bachelor Officers' Quarters
  - Bank of Queensland
- bos – (s) Bosnian language (ISO 639-2 code)
- BOS – (i) Battlefield Operating System
- BOT
  - (i) Balance of Trade
  - (s) Botswana (IOC and FIFA trigram, but not ISO 3166)
  - (i) Build Operate Transfer
  - (i) Bank of Thailand

== BP ==
- BP
  - (i) Battle Position
  - British Petroleum (today, BP does not officially stand for anything)
  - (s) Solomon Islands (FIPS 10-4 country code; from British Protectorate of the Solomon Islands)
- Bp – (i) Bishop
- BPD – (i) Bipolar Personality Disorder
- BPM – (i) Beats Per Minute
- BPMo – (i) Business Process Mobility
- BPV
  - (i) Battlefield Planning Visualization
  - Bovine papillomavirus

== BQ ==
- BQ
  - (s) British Antarctic Territory (former ISO 3166 digram; merged with AQ in 1979)
  - Caribbean Netherlands (current ISO 3166 digram; based on the entity's alternate name of Bonaire, Sint Eustatius and Saba)
  - Navassa Island (FIPS 10-4 territory code)

== BR ==
- br – (s) Breton language (ISO 639-1 code)
- Br – (s) Bromine
- Br – "Best regards" used in valediction
- BR
  - (s) Brazil (ISO 3166 digram; FIPS 10-4 country code) – Bihar (Indian state code)
  - (i) British Rail, previously British Railways
  - Break Ranks (marching band term)
- BRA – (s) Brazil (ISO 3166 trigram)
- BRAG – (a) Bicycle Ride Across Georgia
- BRASS – Breathe, Relax, Aim, Sight, Squeeze (Acronym for using a rifle)
- BRB
  - (s) Barbados (ISO 3166 trigram)
  - (i) "Be Right Back" (Internet chat abbreviation)
- BRDM – (i) Boyevaya Razvedyvatelnaya Dosornaya Mashina (Russian Боевая Разведывательная Дозорная Машина, "Combat Reconnaissance Patrol Vehicle") †
- bre – (s) Breton language (ISO 639-2 code)
- BRFSS – (p) Behavioral Risk Factor Surveillance System ("burf-us", a CDC health survey covering the U.S. and its territories)
- BRI
  - (i) Bathroom Readers Institute (publishers of series of "Uncle John's Bathroom Readers" books)
  - Belt and Road Initiative (China-led Asian transport initiative)
- BRIC – (a) Brazil, Russia, India and China (economics term)
- BRICS – (a) Brazil, Russia, India, China and South Africa (intergovernmental organization)
- BRIDGE – Building Resilienmce through Inclusively Designed Guidance and Education
- BRIMS – (a) Behavior Representation In Modeling and Simulation (conference)
- BRL – (s) Brazilian real (ISO 4217 currency code)
- BRM – (i) Boyevaya Razvedyvatelnaya Mashina (Russian Боевая Разведывательная Машина, "Combat Reconnaissance Vehicle") †
- BRN
  - (s) Bahrain (IOC trigram, but not FIFA or ISO 3166)
  - (s) Brunei (ISO 3166 trigram)
- BRSB – (i) Battlefield Reasoning System Brianna
- BRT – Bus Rapid Transit (alternatively Bus Rapid Transport)
- BRU – (s) Brunei (IOC and FIFA trigram, but not ISO 3166)

== BS ==
- bs – (s) Bosnian language (ISO 639-1 code)
- BS
  - (s) The Bahamas (ISO 3166 digram)
  - Bassas da India (FIPS 10-4 territory code)
  - Bachelor of Science degree
  - British subject
  - Bullshit
- BSA
  - (i) Birmingham Small Arms (motorcycles company)
  - Boy Scouts of America
  - Brigade Support Area
- BSatCoP – Benjamin Sniddlegrass and the Cauldron of Penguins
- BSc
  - Bachelor of Science degree
- BSD
  - (s) Bahamian dollar (ISO 4217 currency code)
  - (i) Berkeley Software Distribution (distinct from BSoD)
- BSE – (i) Bovine Spongiform Encephalopathy, better known as mad cow disease
- BSE – (i) Buku Sekolah Elektronik (screw thread),
- BSF – (i) British Standard Fine (screw thread)
- BSL
  - (i) Basketbol Süper Ligi (Turkish, "Basketball Super League"; top Turkish men's league)
  - British Sign Language
- BSMB – (i) British Society for Matrix Biology
- BSN
  - Baloncesto Superior Nacional (Spanish, "National Superior Basketball"; top Puerto Rican league)
  - Bank Simpanan Nasional (Malay, "National Savings Bank"; government-owned Malaysian bank)
- BSNL
  - Bharat Sanchar Nigam Limited
  - (i) Bachelor of Science in Nursing
- BSoD – (i) Blue Screen of Death (distinct from BSD)
- BSP
  - (i) Between-Show Promotion
  - Binary Space Partitioning
  - Board Support Package
  - British Standard Pipe (screw thread)
  - (p) Business-sponsored
  - Bone sialoprotein
- BSS
  - Block Starting with Symbol – see .bss
  - Boxed Set Syndrome – where one starts watching a boxed set of DVDs and just can't stop until you've watched them all
- BST
  - (i) Binary search tree
  - Blended Sales Tax
  - (p) Bovine somatotropin
  - (i) British Summer Time
- BSW
  - Bachelor of Social Work degree
  - (i) British Standard Whitworth (screw thread)
  - Blind Spot Warning, see Blind spot monitor
- BSX – (i) Bendigo Stock Exchange

== BT ==
- Bt
  - (i) Baronet
  - Bacillus thuringiensis
- BT
  - (i) Baal teshuva (Hebrew, "master of return") – used to describe a Jew who adopts Orthodox Judaism as an adult
  - Bathythermograph
  - (s) Bhutan (FIPS 10-4 country code; ISO 3166 digram)
  - (i) BitTorrent
  - British Telecom, the former name of the company now known as BT Group
  - Bluetooth
- BTDT – (i) Been There, Done That
- Bti – (i) Bacillus thuringiensis israelensis
- BTID – (i) Battlefield Target Identification Device
- BTIS – (i) Battlefield Target Identification System
- BTN
  - (s) Bhutan (ISO 3166 trigram)
  - Bhutanese ngultrum (ISO 4217 currency code)
- BTO – (i) Built To Order
- BTP – (i) British Transport Police
- BTR – (i) Bronetransporter (БТР = Бронетранспортер "(Heavy) Armoured (Personnel) Transporter") †
- BTS
  - (p) Bangtan Sonyeondan (Korean, 방탄소년단; literally "Bulletproof Boy Scouts"), expansion of the name of South Korean band BTS
  - (i) Base transceiver station
  - Beyond the Scene, promoted by the band BTS as an alternate expansion of its initialism
  - Build to stock (production approach)
  - Bureau of Transportation Statistics, U.S. federal agency
  - Business Training Systems, original name of the Swedish professional services firm BTS Group
- BTU – (i) British Thermal Unit
- BTW – (s) By The Way

== BU ==
- BU – (s)
  - Bulgaria (FIPS 10-4 country code) –
  - Burma (ISO 3166 digram; obsolete since 1989)
- BUAV – (i) British Union for the Abolition of Vivisection
- BUG-E – (a) Battlefield Universal Gateway Equipment ("buggy")
- bul – (s) Bulgarian language (ISO 639-2 code)
- BUL – (s) Bulgaria (IOC and FIFA trigram, but not ISO 3166)
- BUNO or BuNo – (p) Bureau Number (aircraft serial number)
- BUR – (s) Burma (ISO 3166 trigram; obsolete since 1989)

== BV ==
- BV – (i)
  - Background Vocals –
  - Battlefield Visualization – (s)
  - Bouvet Island (ISO 3166 digram; FIPS 10-4 territory code)
- BVB
  - (p) Ballspielverein Borussia 09 e.V. Dortmund, the full German name of the football club known in English as Borussia Dortmund
  - Bursa de Valori București (Romanian for Bucharest Stock Exchange)
- BVD – (i) Bradley, Voorhees & Day (underwear manufacturer)
- BVR – (i) Beyond Visual Range
- BVT – (s) Bouvet Island (ISO 3166 trigram)

== BW ==
- B&W – (i) Babcock & Wilcox – Black and White – Bowers & Wilkins
- BW – (s) Bring Wedges (ISO digram)
- BW – (s) Botswana (ISO 3166 digram)
- BWA – (s) Botswana (ISO 3166 trigram)
- BWARS – (a) Bees, Wasps & Ants Recording Society
- BWC – (p) Biological and Toxin Weapons Convention
- BWP – (s) Botswana pula (ISO 4217 currency code)
- BWR – (i) Boiling-Water Reactor

== BX ==
- BX – (p) Base eXchange – (s)

== BY ==
- BY – (s)
  - Burundi (FIPS 10-4 country code) –
  - Belarus (ISO 3166 digram)
- BYOB – (i) Bring Your Own Bottle (or "beer", "beverage", or "booze") (multiple, but similar, meanings)
- BYOC – (i) Bring Your Own Computer (play on BYOB)
- BYOF – (i) Bring Your Own Flask
- BYR – (s) Belarusian rubel (ISO 4217 currency code)
- BYS – (s) Byelorussian Soviet Socialist Republic (ISO 3166 trigram; obsolete since 1992)
- BYU – (i) Brigham Young University

== BZ ==
- BZ – (s) Belize (ISO 3166 digram)
- BZD – (s) Belize dollar (ISO 4217 currency code)
- BZP – (p) Benzylpiperazine
