= BHS =

BHS may refer to:

- Back handspring
- Baggage handling system, in airports
- Bahamas, ISO 3166-1 alpha-3 code
- Beck Hopelessness Scale, a psychological test
- Biblia Hebraica Stuttgartensia, 1977 Hebrew Bible
- Breath-holding spell, a form of abnormal breathing mostly found in young children
- British Home Stores, a retailer
- Buddhist Hybrid Sanskrit, a modern linguistic category
- IATA code for Bathurst Airport (New South Wales)

== Organisations ==
- Bahamasair airline, ICAO code
- Barbershop Harmony Society, a barbershop music organization
- Beverly Hills Schools, 6th of October City, Egypt
- BHS, roller coaster manufacturer now part of Maurer Söhne
- British Herpetological Society, a professional association
- British Horse Society, a membership-based equine charity
- British Home Stores
- British Hydrological Society, a professional association
- Brooklyn Historical Society, US museum, library, and educational center

== Schools ==
- Bakersfield High School, Bakersfield, California, United States
- Barrington High School, Barrington, Rhode Island, United States
- Bayonne High School, Bayonne, New Jersey, United States
- Beaverton High School, Beaverton, Oregon, United States
- Bellevue High School, Bellevue, Washington, United States
- Bellingham High School (Massachusetts), Bellingham, Massachusetts, United States
- Bellingham High School (Washington), Bellingham, Washington, United States
- Bensalem High School, Bensalem, Pennsylvania, United States
- Benson Polytechnic High School, Portland, Oregon, United States
- Bentonville High School, Bentonville, Arkansas, United States
- Bergenfield High School, Bergenfield, New Jersey, United States
- Berkeley Hall School, Los Angeles, California, United States
- Berkner High School, Richardson, Texas, United States
- Bernards High School, Bernardsville, New Jersey, United States
- Blackburn High School, Melbourne, Victoria, Australia
- Bloomfield Hall Schools, Pakistan
- Bluefield High School, Bluefield, West Virginia, United States
- Bluestone High School, Skipwith, Virginia, United States
- Boroughmuir High School, Edinburgh, Scotland, United Kingdom
- Bountiful High School, Bountiful, Utah, United States
- Boys' High School & College (Allahabad, Uttar Pradesh), Allahabad, India
- Braintree High School, Braintree, Massachusetts, United States
- Brookline High School, Brookline, Massachusetts, United States
- Bupyeong High School, Incheon, South Korea
- Burnside High School, Christchurch, New Zealand
- Burnsville High School, Burnsville, Minnesota, United States
