= BSD (disambiguation) =

BSD is the Berkeley Software Distribution, a free Unix-like operating system, and numerous variants.

BSD may also refer to:

== Science, technology, and mathematics ==
- Bipolar spectrum disorder
- Birch and Swinnerton-Dyer conjecture, an important unsolved problem in mathematics
- Blind spot detection in vehicles

=== Computing ===
- BSD licenses, a family of permissive free software licenses originally from the Berkeley Software Distribution
- Bit stream decoder, a video decoder in a graphics processing unit

== Organizations ==
- Birsa Seva Dal, a political group in India
- Bob- und Schlittenverband für Deutschland, the bobsleigh, luge, and skeleton federation for Germany
- Blue State Digital, a new media strategy and technology firm
- Cray Business Systems Division, or Cray BSD

=== Schools ===
- Beaverton School District, a school district in Beaverton, Oregon, US (Portland, Oregon area)
- Bellevue School District, the school district of Bellevue, Washington, US (Seattle area)
- Benoit School District, the school district of Benoit, Mississippi, US
- Brandywine School District, a school district in New Castle County, Delaware, US (Philadelphia area)
- Burlingame School District, a school district in Burlingame, California, US (San Francisco area)

== Sports ==
- Bally Sports Detroit, American regional sports network owned and operated by Bally Sports
- Benoît Saint-Denis (born 1995) or BSD, French mixed martial artist

== Transportation ==
- Baoshan Yunduan Airport (IATA code), China
- Bishan Depot (MRT depot code), Singapore

== Places ==
- Bumi Serpong Damai, a planned city in Greater Jakarta, Indonesia

== Other uses ==
- Bahamian dollar, ISO 4217 code BSD
- Besiyata Dishmaya, BS"D, an Aramaic phrase meaning "with the help of Heaven"
- BSD Records, a 1950s record label
- Bungo Stray Dogs, a Japanese manga series and its franchise
- Bitch Suck Dick, a 2011 song by Tyler, The Creator, Jasper Dolphin and Taco, on the former's second studio album, Goblin.

== See also ==
- Berkeley Software Design (BSDi), a former corporation which developed, sold and supported BSD/OS
- BSD/OS, originally called BSD/386 and sometimes known as BSDi, a proprietary version of the BSD operating system developed by Berkeley Software Design
- List of BSD operating systems (*BSD)
- Blue Screen of Death (BSoD), an error screen displayed after a fatal system error
- Bipolar Spectrum Diagnostic Scale (BSDS)
- BDS
