= Bev =

Bev may refer to:

- Bev, short for beverage
- Bev (company), an American female-owned wine company
- Bev (given name), a list of people and fictional characters with the unisex given name

BEV may stand for:

- Battery electric vehicle
- Beam's eye view, an imaging technique used in radiation therapy
- Black English Vernacular, a form of English commonly spoken by some African-Americans in the United States
- Blacksburg Electronic Village, a project of Virginia Tech university, United States
- British Electric Vehicles Ltd, Southport, Lancashire, an early manufacturer of electric road and rail vehicles
- Bundesamt für Eich- und Vermessungswesen, the Austrian agency for national mapping and metronomy
- Billion-electronvolt (BeV), equivalent to the SI term GeV (gigaelectronvolt)

BEVS may stand for:

- Baculovirus Expression Vector System, a technique used in molecular biology to introduce specific genes into target cells
- Ballistic: Ecks vs. Sever, a 2002 action film
  - Ballistic: Ecks vs. Sever, a direct video game tie-in to the film
