= BI =

BI, Bi or bi may refer to:

== Language ==
- Bi-, a number prefix denoting two, as in:
  - Air Sylphe Bi 582, a French design for a two-seat French powered parachute
  - Bisexuality, attraction to both men and women, or any generalization of that
  - See also: bipolar (disambiguation)
- Bi (cuneiform), a sign representing a syllable such as "bé", "pí", or "kaš"
- Bi (kana), in syllabic Japanese script
- BI, the ISO 639-1 code for the Bislama language, an English-based creole in Vanuatu
- Bahasa Indonesia, the Indonesian language, of the Riau Malay dialect continuum within the Austronesian family

== Places ==
- Barrie—Innisfil, two similar or identical electoral districts in Ontario at different levels of government
  - The pre-2023 name of Barrie South—Innisfil, a Canadian federal electoral district
  - Barrie—Innisfil (provincial electoral district)
- Burundi, by World Meteorological Organization and ISO 3166-1 country code

== Transportation ==
- B.I — see List of B1 aircraft § B.I
- Braniff International Airways, a former airline
- British India Steam Navigation Company, 1856–1972 ship owner and ship operator, named "Calcutta and Burmah Steam Navigation Company" until 1862
- BI, the IATA code of Royal Brunei Airlines
- Bereznyak-Isayev BI-1, a Soviet short-range rocket-powered interceptor developed during WWII

== Government, business, and computing ==
- Bilhete de identidade (Mozambique), the Mozambican national identity card
- Bilhete de Identidade (Portugal), the former Portuguese national identity card, established 1919, phasing out since 2008
- Macau Resident Identity Card (Portuguese: Bilhete de Identidade de Residente, BIR), in part replacing the Bilhete de Identidade Cidadão Estrangeiro (BICE)
- Bureau of Immigration (Philippines), a government agency in the Department of Justice of the Philippines
- Bank Indonesia, the central bank of Indonesia
- Berggruen Institute, Los Angeles-based think tank, researching governance, economics, geopolitics, and technology
- BI (short for "British Invisibles"), the 1990/1998–2001 name of International Financial Services, London (IFSL), a 1968–2010 trade association
- Business Insider, a New York City-based multinational financial and business news website
- BI Norwegian Business School, originally Bedriftsøkonomisk Institutt, a teaching and research organization, with its main campus in Nydalen, Oslo
- Business interruption insurance or business income insurance
- Batteries Included (company), 1978–1987 computer software and hardware company based in the Toronto area
- Business intelligence, data analysis and management of information to inform strategies and operations
- Business informatics, the combined discipline of information technology, economics, and administration
- Microsoft Power BI, a software product for interactive data visualization, database management, and data modeling
- Breidbart Index, a cancel index measuring Usenet message repetition to detect newsgroup spam
- .bi, the Internet top-level domain for Burundi

== Science and medicine ==
- Biot number (Bi), a dimensionless quantity in heat transfer calculations
- Bismuth (symbol Bi), the chemical element with atomic number 83
- Burning Index, a number used by NOAA to quantify the effort needed to contain a fire
- Boehringer Ingelheim, a German pharmaceutical firm
- Brain injury, the destruction or degeneration of brain cells
- One of two Chinese constellations:
  - Bì (壁), meaning Wall
  - Bì (毕), meaning Net

== Music ==
- Bi, a stage name of Jung Ji-hoon (born 1982), also known as Rain (entertainer), South Korean singer, songwriter, dancer, actor, and record producer
- B.I (rapper) (Korean: 비아이) (born Kim Han-bin, 1996), South Korean songwriter, rapper, singer and record producer
- Bi (Astyplaz album), 2008
- Bi (Kevin Johansen album), 2012
- "Bi" (song) by Living Colour on Stain (1993)

== People ==
- Bi (surname) (畢/毕), a Chinese family name
- Farmida Bi, Baroness Bi, a Labour Party life peer in the House of Lords

== Other uses ==
- Bi (jade), a type of circular ancient Chinese artifact
- "B.I.: Bartificial Intelligence", a segment from the cartoon The Simpsons, S17 E4 "Treehouse of Horror XVI" (2005)
- Bohemia Interactive a.s., a Czech developer and publisher of video games
- Brandon Ingram (born 1997), American professional basketball player, who joined a Canadian team, the Toronto Raptors, in 2025
- Bishop Ireton High School, a Catholic high school in Alexandria, Virginia, US

== See also ==
- Bibi (disambiguation)
- BII (disambiguation)
- Same or similar appearance:
  - Ы, Yery or Yeru, a letter in the Cyrillic script
  - B1 (disambiguation)
  - Bl (disambiguation)
  - el:ΒΙ
  - uk:Ві
  - chr:ᏏᏆ
  - ml:ദീ
- Same or similar pronunciation:
  - By (disambiguation)
  - Bye (disambiguation)
  - Buy (disambiguation)
  - Bie (disambiguation)
  - BIH (disambiguation)
