= BSW =

BSW may refer to:

- Bachelor of Social Work, an academic qualification at some institutions
- Bally Sports West, American regional sports network owned and operated by Bally Sports
- Batesville Southwestern Railroad, Mississippi, United States
- Bethesda Softworks, a video game publisher
- Birmingham Snow Hill railway station, Birmingham, England (National Rail station code: BSW)
- Black Sidewall is a characteristic of a tire used in the reference code.
- Blind Spot Warning, an auto-safety capability
- Boswell Bay Airport (IATA: BSW), Alaska, United States
- BrettspielWelt, an online boardgame portal
- British School of Washington, a DC area private school specializing in British and international curriculum
- British Standard Whitworth, an imperial-unit based screw-thread standard
- BSW (basketball club), a Dutch professional basketball team
- Bündnis Soziale Gerechtigkeit und Wirtschaftliche Vernunft, a German political party, formerly Bündnis Sahra Wagenknecht
  - BSW group (Bundestag), a former parliamentary group in Germany
- Belarusian Steel Works
