= BHD =

BHD may refer to:

- Bahraini dinar, the currency of Bahrain (ISO 4217: BHD)
- Banco BHD, a bank in the Dominican Republic
- Berhad (Bhd.), a Malaysian form of company
- Birt–Hogg–Dubé syndrome, a genetic disorder
- Black Hawk Down (book), a 1999 non-fiction book by Mark Bowden
  - Black Hawk Down (film), a 2001 dramatisation
  - Delta Force: Black Hawk Down, a 2003 video game
- Bulkhead (disambiguation)
- George Best Belfast City Airport, Northern Ireland (IATA: BHD)
