= BRM (disambiguation) =

BRM may refer to:

== Business ==
- Business reference model
- Business relationship management, a formal approach to understanding, defining, and supporting inter-business activities
- Business reply mail, a term for freepost in some countries

== Sport ==
- Brevet Randonneurs Mondiaux, long distance endurance cycling events sanctioned by the Audax Club Parisien
- British Racing Motors, former British Formula One motor racing team
- Team BRM, Australian motor racing team

== Other uses ==
- Ballot Resolution Meeting, an International Organization for Standardization (ISO) procedure
- Biological response modifiers, substances that alter immune response
- British Railway Modelling, a British hobby magazine
- Jacinto Lara International Airport, Barquisimeto, Venezuela (by IATA code)
- BRM-1, a military vehicle
