= BFS =

BFS may refer to:

== Science and technology ==
- Big Falcon Ship, precursor of SpaceX Starship
- Benign fasciculation syndrome, a neurological disorder
- Blow fill seal, a manufacturing technique

=== Computing ===
- Basic feasible solution, in linear programming
- Be File System, the native file system for the Be Operating System
- Best-first search, a path finding algorithm
- Boot File System, a file system used on UnixWare to store files necessary to its boot process
- Brain Fuck Scheduler, a process scheduler for the Linux kernel
- Breadth-first search, a graph search algorithm

== Organisations ==
- BFS Group, foodservice wholesaler and distributor
- Bournemouth Film School, part of Arts University Bournemouth
- Basketball Federation of Slovenia, sports governing body
- Bibby Financial Services, UK-based multinational financial services provider
- Bio Fuel Systems, a Spanish company using captured CO_{2} to create fuel
- British Fantasy Society, a group dedicated to promoting the best in the fantasy, science fiction and horror genres
- Bureau of the Fiscal Service, a US Treasury Department bureau
- Bundesamt für Strahlenschutz, the German Federal Office for Radiation Protection
- Federal Statistical Office (Switzerland) (German: Bundesamt für Statistik, BfS)
- Beltane Fire Society, arts charity based in Edinburgh, Scotland that organises twice-yearly festivals
- Brooklyn Friends School, school in Brooklyn, New York, United States
- Busan Foreign School, school in Busan, South Korea

== Other uses ==
- Beatles for Sale, a 1964 album by The Beatles
- Bowling for Soup, an American rock band
- Belfast International Airport (IATA airport code)
