= BML =

BML may refer to:

== Businesses and organizations ==
- Bank of Maldives
- Big Mouth Loud, a member of the Global Professional Wrestling Alliance
- Bill Me Later, now PayPal Credit
- BML Munjal University, a university in Sidhrawali, Haryana, India

== Libraries ==
- Biblioteca Medicea Laurenziana, a library in Florence, Italy
- Boston Medical Library, Boston, Massachusetts

== Transportation ==
- Belfast and Moosehead Lake Railroad (1871–2007), Maine, U.S.
- Biham–Middleton–Levine traffic model
- Bramhall railway station, Stockport, Greater Manchester, England
- Brighton Main Line, a British railway line
- Brighton Main Line 2, a proposed extension of the Oxted line in southern England

== Other uses ==
- Battle management language
- IATA code of Berlin Regional Airport in Berlin, New Hampshire, U.S.
- Big Maple Leaf, a gold coin produced by the Royal Canadian Mint in 2007
- Bingley Music Live, an annual music festival held in Myrtle Park, Bingley, West Yorkshire, England
- BML-190 (Indomethacin morpholinylamide), a drug used in scientific research
- Postal code for Bormla, Malta
- Bray–Moss–Libby model, used in mathematics to describe premixed turbulent combustion
- Broadcast Markup Language (.bml), an XML-based standard
