= BPV =

BPV may refer to:

- Bovine papillomavirus
- Basis point value, in finance
- Back Porch Video, one of the first cable music video programs
- Bipolar violation, in telecommunications
- Bernardo Pereira de Vasconcelos, Brazilian 19th-century congressman
