= BSX =

BSX may refer to:

- Bendigo Stock Exchange, in Australia
- Bermuda Stock Exchange
- Boston Scientific, a Fortune 500 medical device company
- BS-X: Sore wa Namae o Nusumareta Machi no Monogatari, the video game interface for the Satellaview.
  - Sometimes used by fans to refer to the Satellaview device itself.
- Brain-specific homeobox, a homeobox transcription factor encoded by the gene BSX and important for neural development
