= BP (disambiguation) =

BP is a British multinational oil and gas company headquartered in London.

BP, bp, and Bp may also refer to:

== Business and organisations ==
=== Businesses ===
- BP Canada, a division of the oil company BP
- BP Studio, a Florentine fashion house
- Air Botswana, IATA airline code BP
- Boston Pizza, a Canadian-based restaurant chain

=== Political parties ===
- Bavaria Party, a political party in Germany
- Brexit Party, a Eurosceptic political party in the UK now called Reform UK
- Farmers' Party (Netherlands), (in Dutch: Boerenpartij, BP), a defunct political party

=== Sports bodies ===
- Baseball Prospectus, a statistical analysis organization
- IF Brommapojkarna, a Swedish football team

== People ==
- Robert Baden-Powell, 1st Baron Baden-Powell (1857–1941), known as B-P, founder of The Boy Scouts Association
- Benny Parsons (1941–2007), nicknamed BP, NASCAR champion and commentator
- BP Cooper, American screenwriter, film and commercial producer
- BP Fallon (born 1946), Irish DJ and author
- BP Koirala (1914–1982), former Prime Minister of Nepal
- BP Valenzuela (born 1995), Filipino singer-songwriter

== Places ==
- BP Pedestrian Bridge, in the Loop community area of Chicago, Illinois, U.S.
- BP Impact Structure, an impact structure in Libya
- Bletchley Park, the central site for British codebreakers during World War II, known as B.P.
- Bukit Panjang, a Singaporean town
- Solomon Islands, FIPS country code and NATO country code
- Bp., a written abbreviation of Budapest

== Science, technology and mathematics ==
=== Biology and medicine ===
- Base pair (bp), the building blocks of the DNA double helix
- Binding potential, in pharmacokinetics and receptor-ligand kinetics
- Blood pressure
- British Pharmacopoeia

=== Chemicals ===
- Black powder, in pyrotechnics
- Boiling point
- Boron phosphide, a semiconducting compound
- Biphenyl, an organic compound

=== Computing and telecommunications ===
- Base pointer, in 16-bit x86 architecture
- Baseband processor, a device in a network interface

=== Other uses in science, technology and mathematics ===
- Bp star, a stellar classification
- Before Present, a time scale used in science with "Present" being 1 January 1950
- BP, in mathematics, the representing spectrum of the Brown–Peterson cohomology
- BP, a variant of the Mazda B engine

== Other uses ==
- Bohlen–Pierce scale, or B–P scale, a musical tuning and scale
- Black panther (disambiguation), multiple uses
- ⟨bp⟩, a Latin-script digraph
- Basis point, one hundredth of a percent
- British Parliamentary Style, a debate type
- BP (Broken Pekoe), a tea leaf grading
- BP, a house brand of US retailer Nordstrom for apparel
- Riau Islands (vehicle registration prefix BP)
- Bad Piggies, 2012 video game
- Batting practice, a period of warm up for hitters in baseball

== See also ==
- BP holin family (BP-hol), a protein family
- BP Portrait Award
