= BND =

BND may refer to:

== Organisations ==
- Federal Intelligence Service (Germany) (Bundesnachrichtendienst), the foreign intelligence agency of Germany
- Bank of North Dakota, a state-owned and -run financial institution, based in Bismarck, North Dakota, USA
- Belleville News-Democrat, a newspaper in Belleville, Illinois, USA
- Bulgarian New Democracy (Българска Нова Демокрация), a Bulgarian centre-right political party
- VID (company) (ВИD), a Russian TV company
- Business & Decision (stock ticker: BND), a consulting company
- Banco Nacional de Desarrollo, the national development bank, for banking in Nicaragua
- National Digital Library (Romanian: Biblioteca Națională Digitală) of Moldova; part of the National Library of Moldova

== By codename ==
- Brunei dollar, currency of the Sultanate of Brunei, by ISO 4217 code
- Banda language (Maluku) (ISO 639 language code: bnd), found in Indonesia
- Brandon railway station (National Rail station code: BND), Suffolk, England, UK
- Bandar Abbas International Airport (IATA airport code BND; ICAO airport code: OIKB), Bandar Abbas, Hormozgan Province, Iran

== Other uses ==
- Buy Nothing Day, an international day of protest against consumerism
- BTEC National Diploma, a further-education qualification in most of the United Kingdom
- "BND", a song on the album No Doubt by No Doubt
- Bnd, short for "Bend"; a Street suffix as used in the US
- Spider-Man: Brand New Day, a 2026 American superhero film

== See also ==
- Band (disambiguation)
- Bend (disambiguation)
- Bind (disambiguation)
- Bond (disambiguation)
- Bound (disambiguation)
- Bund (disambiguation)
