= BEM =

BEM or Bem may refer to:

== Acronyms ==
- Baptism, Eucharist and Ministry (the Lima-Document of 1982)
- Black and ethnic minority, persons or groups
- Blade element momentum theory, a model for turbine physics
- "Block, element, modifier", a Cascading Style Sheets authoring methodology
- Board of Engineers Malaysia
- Borneo Evangelical Mission, a Christian missionary organisation
- Boundary element method, a numerical analysis method using computation
- Brevet état-major, a military diploma in France and Belgium
- British Empire Medal, a British medal awarded for meritorious civil or military service
- Brotherhood of Evil Mutants, an organization in the fictional X-Men universe
- Bug-eyed monster, a stock character in science fiction
- Bangkok Expressway and Metro Public Company Limited, a Thai transportation operator

== People ==
=== People with the given name Bem ===
- Bem Le Hunte (born 1964), author who has published internationally

=== People with the surname Bem ===
- Daryl Bem (born 1938), social psychologist at Cornell University
- Józef Bem (1794–1850), Polish general and a national hero of Poland and Hungary
- Pavel Bém (born 1963), Czech politician
- Sandra Bem (1944–2014), Pennsylvanian psychologist known for many of her works in androgyny
- Elisabeth Boehm or Elisaveta Merkuryevna Bem (1843–1914), Russian painter

=== People with the nickname or pen name Bem ===
- Bernie Mireault (born 1961), who uses the pen name Bem, a French-Canadian comic book artist and writer

== Art, entertainment, and media ==
- BEM (originally called Bemusing Magazine), a British comics fanzine published by Martin Lock from 1973 to 1982
- "Bem" (Star Trek: The Animated Series), a 1974 episode of the animated television series Star Trek
- Rev Bem, a character in Andromeda TV series
- Humanoid Monster Bem, a 1968–1969 anime re-made in 2006 and 2019

== Places ==
- Bem, Missouri, a community in the United States

== See also ==
- BME (disambiguation)
