= BBN =

BBN might refer to:

- Bayesian belief network, a probabilistic graphical model that represents a set of random variables and their conditional independencies via a directed acyclic graph
- Bible Broadcasting Network, a global Christian radio network headquartered in Charlotte, North Carolina
- Big Bang nucleosynthesis, in physical cosmology
- Big Blue Nation, the fan base of the University of Kentucky athletics programs
- Big Brother Naija (or Big Brother Nigeria), a Nigerian reality show
- Biuro Bezpieczeństwa Narodowego, a Polish government agency
- Brevard Business News, a weekly newspaper in Melbourne, Florida, United States
- Buckingham Browne & Nichols School (BB&N), a private school in Cambridge, Massachusetts
- 9-Borabicyclo(3.3.1)nonane (9-BBN), a reagent used in organic chemistry
- The 3-letter code for Blackburn railway station, in the UK
- Blackburn railway station, Melbourne, in Australia
- Bengbu South railway station, China Railway pinyin code BBN
- Raytheon BBN Technologies, formerly Bolt, Beranek and Newman, a technology company in Cambridge, Massachusetts

== See also ==
- Biodiversity Beyond National Jurisdiction (BBNJ) treaty, within the framework of the United Nations Convention on the Law of the Sea
