= BYS =

BYS, Bys, or Byś may refer to:

- Angela Bys (born 1989), American volleyball player
- Jan Byś (1953–2026), Polish footballer
- "B.Y.S.", a song from the album Daily Operation by Gang Starr
- Baggio–Yoshinari Syndrome, a tick-borne disease found in Brazil
- Boston Youth Symphony
