= BDT =

BDT may refer to:

== Businesses and organisations ==
- BDT & MSD Partners, an American merchant bank
- Baker Dearing Educational Trust, a British charity
- BDT Media Automation, a German manufacturer of robotic tape libraries

=== People ===
- Brian D. Tripp (Karuk, 1945–2022), artist who signed his work BDT

== Places ==
- Bolshoi Drama Theater, Saint Petersburg, Russia
- British Overseas Territories (formerly British Dependent Territories)
- Gbadolite Airport, DR Congo (IATA:BDT)

== Other uses ==
- Ballistic deflection transistor, electronic devices for high-speed integrated circuits
- Bangladeshi taka (ISO 4217 code), the currency of Bangladesh
- Bangladesh Standard Time, sometimes abbreviated BDT to distinguish from British Standard Time (BST)
- The Best Damn Thing, a 2007 album by Avril Lavigne
- Black–Derman–Toy model, a short rate model in mathematical finance
- Bokoto language (ISO 639-3 code), a Gbaya language of the Central African Republic
