= BFX =

BFX may refer to:

- Bafoussam Airport, Cameroon (IATA airport code)
- Buffalo–Exchange Street station, United States (Amtrak station code BFX)
