= BDO =

BDO may refer to:

- Ballon d'Or, an annual football award
- Banco de Oro, one of the largest banks in the Philippines
- Barton, Durstine & Osborn, the former name of advertising agency BBDO
- BDO Global, the world's fifth-largest accountancy network
- BDO USA
- Behavior Detection Officer, part of the Transportation Security Administration
- Big Day Out, an annual music festival held in Australia and New Zealand
- Big Dumb Object, a term used in science fiction
- Black Desert Online, an MMORPG
- Block Development Officer, the official in charge of an administrative division (block) of some South Asian countries
- British Darts Organisation (now defunct), former governing body of British darts
- Business Depot Ogden, the former Defense Depot Ogden Utah converted into a business park
- Butanediol, especially 1,4-Butanediol, an organic chemical compound and psychoactive drug
- League of German Officers (German: Bund Deutscher Offiziere), an association of German prisoners of war in the Soviet Union
- The IATA code of Husein Sastranegara International Airport, the airport serving Bandung, Indonesia

== Computers ==
- <bdo></bdo>, an HTML element for bi-directional override, see HTML element § bdo
