= BDD =

BDD or bdd may refer to:

== Science and technology ==
- Body dysmorphic disorder, a mental disorder involving a disturbed body image
- Boron-doped diamond, synthetic diamond containing some boron; see Electro-oxidation
- Brachydactyly type D, a genetic trait, a thumb being relatively short

=== Computing ===
- Balancing domain decomposition, a parallel iterative method in numerical analysis
- Behavior-driven development, a software development technique
- Binary decision diagram, a data structure in computer science
- Business Desktop Deployment, project management tools published by Microsoft
- Business-driven development, a software development methodology focusing on business requirements

== Organisations ==
- Bantam Doubleday Dell, a book publisher that became part of Random House
- Bund der Deutschen, a German political party of the 1950s and 1960s

== Places ==
- Badu Island Airport (IATA code), Queensland, Australia
- Baoding East railway station (CR code), Hebei, China
- Beirut Digital District, Lebanon

== Other uses ==
- Bdd (gamer), South Korean professional League of Legends player
- "B.D.D.", a 1969 single by The Groundhogs
- ISO 639:bdd, the Bunama language spoken in Papua New Guinea
