= BBD =

BBD may stand for:

== Finance ==
- Banco Bradesco, by NYSE ticker symbol
- Bombardier Inc., by Toronto Stock Exchange symbol
- Barbadian dollar, by ISO 4217 code

== Music ==
- Bell Biv DeVoe, an R&B group
  - BBD (album), 2001
  - "B.B.D. (I Thought It Was Me)?", a song from Poison
    - B.B.D. (The Poison Tour)
- "BBD" (song), 2013, by Azealia Banks
- Be-Bop Deluxe, a rock band
- Big Black Delta, an electronic music project

== Other uses ==
- B. B. D. Bagh, a business district in Kolkata
  - B.B.D. Bag railway station
- Beech bark disease, a tree pathogen
- Big black dog, a type of mixed-breed subject to black-dog bias
- Birmingham Blitz Dames, an English roller derby team
- Bucket-brigade device, an analogue delay line in electronics
