= BLK =

BLK may refer to:

== Locations ==
- Blackpool Airport (BLK), airport in England
- Burgenlandkreis (BLK), district in Saxony-Anhalt, Germany

== Organisations ==
- BLK, an Australian sports clothing company
- BlackRock, the American investment management firm
- Basket Liga Kobiet (Women's Basketball League), the top women's basketball league in Poland

== Brands ==
- BLK (magazine), 1988–1994 US magazine
- Bonluck, a Chinese bus manufacturer
- Mercedes Benz BLK-Class

== Other ==
- BLK (gene), gene in humans
  - B lymphocyte kinase
- Ray BLK, a British singer
- Pa'O language (ISO 639-3 code blk)
- .300 AAC Blackout designated as the 300 BLK by the SAAMI
