= BTI =

BTI or Bti may refer to:

Acronyms

- Bacillus thuringiensis israelensis (Bti), a bacterium
- Barisan Tani Indonesia
- Baron Tornado Index of tornado probability
- Before the Impact, an American TV series
- Beverage Testing Institute
- Bicycle Technologies International, Santa Fe, New Mexico, US
- Boston Theological Institute
- Boyce Thompson Institute for Plant Research, Cornell University, Ithaca, New York, US
- Branch Target Identification, an AMD technology for mitigating computer security exploits;
- Branch Target Injection or Spectre variant 2, a security vulnerability
- Breaking the Impasse, an Israel-Palestinian group
- Breed Technologies, Inc., now known as Joyson Safety Systems
- Btrieve Technologies, Inc.
- Because the Internet, the second studio album by American singer Childish Gambino

Codes and symbols

- Barter Island LRRS Airport, Alaska, US, IATA airport code
- British American Tobacco PLC, NYSE symbol
- The ICAO designator of the Latvian flag carrier, AirBaltic.
