= Bulkhead =

Bulkhead may refer to:

== Structural safety devices ==
- Bulkhead (partition), a wall within the hull of a ship, vehicle, or container
- Torpedo bulkhead, a type of armor plate or protective covering designed to keep a ship afloat even if the hull is struck by a shell or by a torpedo
- Bulkhead (barrier), a retaining wall used as a form of coastal management, akin to a seawall, or as a structural device such as a bulkhead partition
- Bulkhead door, an angled door covering the exterior stairwell of a basement
- Bulkhead flatcar, a type of rolling stock designed with sturdy end-walls to prevent loads from shifting past the ends of the car
- Rear pressure bulkhead, an airtight structural feature of an aircraft

== Other ==
- Bulkhead, Ohio, United States, an unincorporated community
- Bulkhead (Transformers), the name given to several fictional characters in the Transformers universes
- Bulkhead line, a method of coastal demarcation used within a legal system
- Bulkhead (company), British video game developer
