= BTR =

BTR or BTr may refer to:

== Arts and entertainment ==
=== Music ===
- B.T.R. (band), a Bulgarian rock band
- Bad Trip Records, an American record label
- Beyond Therapy Records, an American industrial music record label
- Big Tent Revival, a Christian rock band
- Big Time Rush (group), a musical group created by Nickelodeon for the TV series
  - BTR (album), their debut album
  - Big Time Rush (Big Time Rush song)
- Black Toast Records, a record label
- Born to Run, a 1975 rock album by Bruce Springsteen
- "Born to Run" (Bruce Springsteen song)
- Black The Ripper, a British rapper

=== Other media ===
- Big Time Rush (TV series), a Nickelodeon television series
- BlogTalkRadio
- British Tape Recorders, reel-to-reel tape recorders made by EMI in England
- Bocchi the Rock!, Japanese manga and anime

== Businesses ==
- BTR Aerospace Group
- BTR plc, formerly BTR Industries, one of the predecessor companies of Invensys plc
- British Thomson-Houston (former name BTR), a British engineering and heavy industrial company

== Politics ==
- BTR–EMS–AKG Janakeeya Vedi, a political group in India
- B. T. Ranadive (1904–1990), Indian communist leader
- Bureau of the Treasury, a Philippine government agency

== Real estate ==
- Build to rent, a British term for residential properties intended for the rental market.

== Sports ==
- Barcelona Trail Races

== Transportation facilities ==
- Baton Rouge Metropolitan Airport, Louisiana, US
- Braintree railway station (England), station code

== Vehicles ==
- BTR (vehicle), Soviet/Russian armored personnel carriers
- Ruf BTR, a sportscar
