= BLZ =

BLZ may mean:

- Belize
- IATA airport code for Chileka International Airport, Blantyre, Malawi
- Bankleitzahl, a former numbering system for German and Austrian banks, replaced by BIC and IBAN
