= BMI =

BMI may refer to:

== Medicine and computing ==
- BMI Healthcare, UK
- Body mass index of weight in relation to height
- Brain Machine Interface
- Bit Manipulation Instruction Sets for x86 microprocessors

== Arts and media ==
- BMI Foundation, founded by Broadcast Music Incorporated
- Broadcast Music, Inc., a collecting society for composers' copyrights
- BMI Awards, annual award ceremonies for songwriters
- BMI Film & TV Awards
- Best Motoring International, a Japanese magazine

== Aviation ==
- British Midland International, a UK airline incorporated into BA
  - Flybmi airline, formerly BMI Regional and a BMI mainline subsidiary
  - Bmibaby.com, former airline, BMI subsidiary
- Central Illinois Regional Airport, IATA code

== Economics ==
- BMI Research, a research firm
- Bank of Makati, a Philippine bank
- Bank Melli Iran, the first national Iranian bank
- Big Mac Index

== Education ==
- Birmingham and Midland Institute, England
- Baltimore Museum of Industry

== Government ==
- Bundesministerium des Innern, the German Federal Ministry of the Interior
- Bureau of Military Information, US Civil War agency
