= BBL =

BBL or bbl may refer to:

== Banks ==
- Bank Bruxelles Lambert, a Belgian bank, now merged into ING Group
- Bangkok Bank, a Thai commercial bank (Stock symbol: BBL)
- Belize Bank, a bank of Belize

== Science and medicine ==
- Barrel (unit), measurement of volume with unit symbol bbl
- Benthic boundary layer, the layer of water at the bottom of a body of water
- Bird Banding Laboratory
- Borell-Brascamp-Lieb inequality, in mathematics, an integral inequality
- Brazilian butt lift, a form of buttock augmentation using autologous fat injection

== Sports and pastimes ==
- Big Bash League, an Australian Twenty20 cricket tournament
- Baltic Basketball League
- Basketball Bundesliga
- British Basketball League
- British Bridge League
- Baseball at the Summer Olympics (IOC sport code BBL)

== Transport ==
- Ballera Airport, IATA airport code "BBL"
- Bat & Ball railway station, Kent, England, National Rail station code "BBL"

== Other ==
- Bangsamoro Basic Law
- Bats language (ISO-639-3-Code)
- BBL Pipeline from the Netherlands to England
- BBL, textspeak for "be back later"
- Borough, Block and Lot, New York City real estate identifier
- British Brothers' League, an anti-immigration organisation, 1901–1923
- Bubble Gang, a Philippine comedy show known on-air as BBLGANG or simply BBL since 2023
- BBL Drizzy, an instrumental track created by American producer Metro Boomin
- .bbl, filename extension produced by BibTeX
