= BCE (disambiguation) =

BCE is an abbreviation for Before Common Era, an alternative to BC, or Before Christ.

BCE, bce, or B.C.E. may also refer to:

- Bachelor of Civil Engineering
- Banco Central del Ecuador
- Basic Chess Endings, a book by Reuben Fine
- BCE Inc., formerly Bell Canada Enterprises
- BCE Place, Toronto, Canada, later Brookfield Place
- Bracknell railway station, Berkshire, UK, code
- Bhagalpur College of Engineering
- Entity–control–boundary, an architectural pattern used in software design
- European Central Bank, abbreviated "BCE" in several languages
