= BP Studio =

BP Studio Compagnia della Lana e del Cotone S.P.A.
- Company type: Private
- Industry: Fashion
- Founded: 1959
- Founder: Carla Bandocci
- Headquarters: Florence, Italy
- Area served: Worldwide
- Products: Clothing
- Owner: Barontini family (Francesco, Chiara, Benedetta)
- Number of employees: 30 (2011)
- Website: www.bpstudio.it

BP Studio is a Florentine fashion house that produces women's knitwear.

== History ==
BP Studio was founded in 1959 as Creazioni BP Maglificio SpA by Carla Bandocci and changed its name to BP Studio Compagnia della Lana e del Cotone S.P.A. under the direction of Fernando Barontini (Ms. Bandocci's husband) in 1988. The company began in central Florence as a small producer of private label knits for department stores in the US and Germany. They moved to the city's industrial periphery in the early 1980s to accommodate larger machinery and staff. At this time, they launched their own line of women's knitwear.

Throughout the 1980s and 1990s, BP Studio produced knits for Pucci, Gucci, Ferragamo, Givenchy, Proenza Schouler and The Row (couture label by Mary-Kate and Ashley Olsen). In 2007 the company chose to concentrate solely on its own label and scale back production to prototypes only. Production of BP Studio label clothing is carried out exclusively in Italy.

The company closed their factory in Osmannoro in 2013.

== Stores ==
Company headquarters and factory outlet are located in Sesto Fiorentino. A boutique open to the public is located in central Florence on via della Vigna Nuova. Showrooms (for buyers only) are located in Milan, Rome, Torino, Treviso, Düsseldorf, Brussels, Barcelona and New York. BP Studio is carried by multi-label boutiques worldwide.
