= British Hydrological Society =

Learned society

British Hydrology Society
- Abbreviation: BHS
- Formation: 1983
- Type: NGO
- Legal status: Charity
- Purpose: Professional association
- Coordinates: 51.5011°N 0.1290°W
- Website: www.hydrology.org.uk

The British Hydrological Society (BHS) was formed in 1983 to advance interest and scholarship in scientific and applied aspects of hydrology and encourage member involvement in relevant national and international professional activities, drawing its membership from academic (universities and research institutes) and operational sectors. It is a learned 'Associated Society' of the Institution of Civil Engineers, based in London, and a registered charity.

== Activities ==
The BHS publishes a newsletter (Circulation) and has adopted an international peer-reviewed publication as its journal (Hydrology Research, first published in 1970, is published in partnership by the BHS and the Nordic Association for Hydrology, and is also the official journal of the German and Italian hydrological societies). In the UK the BHS is organised into five regional groups and holds regular local and national meetings, including the National Hydrological Symposium.

Its expertise on issues such as flooding and water supplies is sometimes quoted by journalists - for example, its Chronology of British Hydrological Events (hosted by the University of Dundee), going back to 1800, was cited by the BBC in relation to the Cockermouth floods of November 2009.
