= BWC =

BWC may stand for:

== Companies and organizations ==
- Babcock & Wilcox, a U.S. based power technology company
- Beauty Without Cruelty, a British cosmetics company
- Black Workers Congress
- Bunbury Women's Club, in Western Australia
- Ohio Bureau of Workers' Compensation

== Sports ==
- Baseball World Cup
- Big West Conference, an NCAA-affiliated athletic conference

== Other uses ==
- Bahá'í World Centre
- Baldwin-Wallace College, now Baldwin Wallace University, in Berea, Ohio
- Biological Weapons Convention, a 1975 weapons ban treaty
- Blue Whale Challenge, an online bullying phenomenon
- Body-worn camera
