= Busan Foreign School =

International school in Busan, South Korea

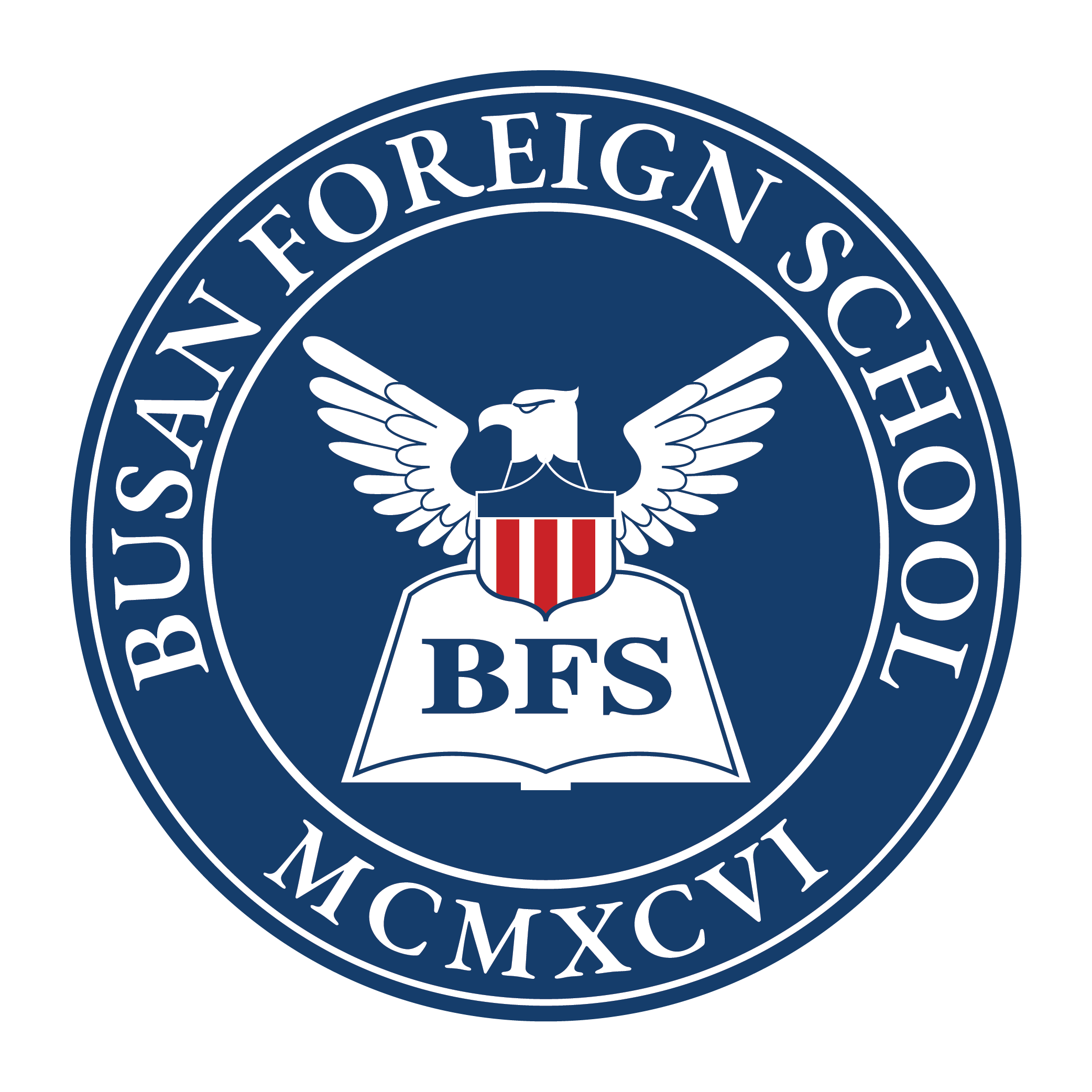
- 45 Daecheon- ro 67beon-gil, Haeundae-gu, Busan Metropolitan City

Information
- School type: Foreign School
- Established: 1996
- Principal: Lauren Harvey, Carl Brenneman
- Enrollment: 260
- Website: busanforeignschool.org

== History ==
Busan Foreign School (BFS; Korean: 부산외국인학교) is an international school in Busan, South Korea. Located in Haeundae District, the school provides an American-style curriculum in English for students from early childhood through Grade 12. The school was established in 1996.

=== Certifications and Programs ===
Busan Foreign School is an international school based on the American educational curriculum and operates the following learning programs and certifications:

- Fully Accredited by ACS-WASC
- Fully Authorized by the Korean Ministry of Edcuation
- Offers US-based Advanced Placement (AP) courses
- American Curriculum -centered education
- The elementary school curriculum is based on the American educational framework and national standards (Common Core).
- Early Childhood reflects the educational philosophy of the Reggio Emilia approach.

The school offers the SAT and Advanced Placement (AP) exams and provides college preparatory and counseling programs for high school students.

The school is classified by the South Korean government as a foreign school and is authorized to operate kindergarten, elementary, middle, and high-school divisions.
