= BWA =

BWA or Bwa may refer to:

== Codes ==
- Botswana, ISO country code
- BWIA West Indies Airways, ICAO code (predecessor of Caribbean Airlines)
- Caribbean Airlines, ICAO code
- Gautam Buddha Airport, IATA code

== Companies and organisations ==
- Baptist World Alliance
- Basketball Western Australia
- Billiards World Cup Association, a former carom-governing body
- Black Women's Action, a 1970s Australian activist group which later became the Roberta Sykes Foundation
- Black Women's Alliance, former name of Third World Women's Alliance, an American Black feminist group established in 1970
- Bosnian Wand Airlines, an airline of Bosnia and Herzegovina

== Languages and people ==
- Baboa people of the Democratic Republic of the Congo, also known as Bwa
- Bwa languages, a branch of the Gur languages spoken by the Bwa people of Burkina Faso and Mali
- Bwa language, a Bantu language spoken in the Democratic Republic of Congo
- Bwa people of Burkina Faso and Mali
- Kho-Bwa languages, a Sino-Tibetan language family of northeast India

== Other uses ==
- Boil-water advisory, a public health advisory notice when water has been contaminated by pathogens
- British West Africa, The Gambia, Sierra Leone, Ghana, and Nigeria in the colonial era
- Broadband Wireless Access, technology that provides high-speed wireless Internet access or computer networking access over a wide area
- Burrows–Wheeler Aligner, a bioinformatic tool (algorithm) to map short nucleotide sequences to a reference genome
- Red Bull Big Wave Africa, a surfing competition

== See also ==
- Baseball Writers' Association of America (BBWAA)
