= BGN =

BGN or bgn may refer to:

- Biglycan, a protein coded by the BGN gene
- The ISO 4217 code of Bulgarian lev, the former currency of Bulgaria
- The Western Balochi language (ISO code: bgn)
- The United States Board on Geographic Names
- Belaya Gora Airport (IATA: BGN), Yakutia, Russia
- Blessed George Napier Roman Catholic School, Banbury, UK
- Bridgend railway station (National Rail station code: BGN), a main line station serving the town of Bridgend, south Wales
- 802.11b/g/n, a designation indicating device support for certain wireless computer networking standards
- Busch Grand National, former name for the NASCAR Xfinity Series
- National Nutrition Agency (Badan Gizi Nasional), an Indonesian government agency
