= BTN =

BTN may refer to:

- Bhutan, a country in South Asia (ISO 3166-1 alpha-3 country code: BTN)
- Bhutanese ngultrum, the currency of Bhutan by ISO 4217 currency code
- Bataan, ISO-3166 code for the Philippine province
- Bauxite and Northern Railway, a railroad operating in Arkansas, United States
- Behind the News, an educational news & current affairs programme for children in Australia
- Beyond the Neighbourhood, a 2007 album by an English indie rock band Athlete
- Big Ten Network, a regional sports television network in the United States
- Biro Tata Negara (National Civics Bureau), a Malaysian government agency
- Botanic Gardens MRT station, Singapore (MRT station abbreviation BTN)
- Bornfree Technologies Network, a private television broadcaster from West Nile, Uganda
- Bank Tabungan Negara, a bank in Indonesia
- British Television Network, BTN, a fictional British state television broadcaster in the film V for Vendetta
- Britton Municipal Airport, South Dakota US (FAA Identifier BTN)
- Marlboro County Jetport, an airport near Bennettsville, South Carolina, United States (IATA airport code BTN)
- Brighton railway station, a railway station in Sussex, England
- Burlington Union Station, a railway station in Vermont, United States (station code BTN)
