= BAMC =

BAMC may refer to:

- Bay Area Medical Center
- Blue Angels Motorcycle Club
- British Airways Maintenance Cardiff
- Brooke Army Medical Center
