= Beam's eye view =

Beam's eye view (abbreviated BEV) is an imaging technique used in radiation therapy for quality assurance and planning of external beam radiotherapy (EBRT). These are primarily used to ensure that the relative orientation of the patient and the treatment machine are correct. The BEV image will typically include the images of the patient's anatomy and the beam modifiers, such as jaws or multi-leaf collimators (MLCs).

== Generation of beam's eye views ==
- Physical construction:
  - BEVs can be generated by exposing a high energy film (similar to photographic film) or an electronic portal imaging device (EPID) with the treatment beam itself after it passes through the patient and any beam modifiers (such as blocks). Although this type of image is an excellent indication of the basic quality of the treatment plan, the quality of film images can be poor.
  - A BEV can be created using a radiation therapy simulator that mimics the treatment geometry (couch angle, gantry angle, etc.) using an X-ray source instead of the higher energy treatment source. The jaws and blocks can be imaged on the same film as the patient's landmarks.
- Artificial reconstruction: The BEV can be created using a digitally reconstructed radiograph (DRR) that is created from a computed tomography (or CT) data set. This image would contain the same treatment plan information, but the patient image is reconstructed from the CT image data using a physics model.
