= BOQ =

BOQ or Boq may refer to:

- Bachelor Officer Quarters, which are buildings on U.S. Military bases for quartering commissioned officers (as opposed to BEQ (Bachelor Enlisted Quarters) used by enlisted personnel).
- Bank of Queensland, an Australian bank headquartered in Brisbane, Queensland
- Bitter Old Queen, humorous gay slang
- Bill of quantities, a term used in quantity surveying
- Boq (Oz), a minor character in the Oz books
  - Boq Woodsman, the version of the character in the Wicked books, musical, and films
