= BML-190 =

Chemical compound

Clinical data
- Other names: BML190; Indomethacin morpholinylamide
- ATC code: None

Identifiers
- IUPAC name: 2-[1-(4-chlorobenzoyl)-5-methoxy-2-methylindol-3-yl]-1-morpholin-4-ylethanone
- CAS Number: 2854-32-2
- PubChem CID: 2415
- ChemSpider: 2321
- CompTox Dashboard (EPA): DTXSID50951230

Chemical and physical data
- Formula: C_{23}H_{23}ClN_{2}O_{4}
- Molar mass: 426.90 g·mol^{−1}
- 3D model (JSmol): Interactive image
- SMILES: C4COCCN4C(=O)Cc(c(c1cc2)cc2OC)c(C)n1C(=O)c3ccc(Cl)cc3
- InChI: InChI=1S/C23H23ClN2O4/c1-15-19(14-22(27)25-9-11-30-12-10-25)20-13-18(29-2)7-8-21(20)26(15)23(28)16-3-5-17(24)6-4-16/h3-8,13H,9-12,14H2,1-2H3; Key:BJSDNVVWJYDOLK-UHFFFAOYSA-N

BML-190, also known as indomethacin morpholinylamide, is a drug used in scientific research that acts as a selective CB_{2} inverse agonist. BML-190 is structurally derived from the NSAID indomethacin but has a quite different biological activity. The activity produced by this compound is disputed, with some sources referring to it as a CB_{2} agonist rather than an inverse agonist; this may reflect an error in classification, or alternatively it may produce different effects in different tissues, and more research is required to resolve this dispute.

== See also ==
- Substituted tryptamine
