= BM =

BM or bm may refer to:

== Arts and entertainment ==
=== Music ===
- BM (rapper), born Matthew Kim, a Korean-American rapper
- BM (singer), a Congolese-born, British singer-songwriter, dancer, director and record producer
- BM (album), a 2008 Barbara Morgenstern album
- B minor, a musical chord (Bm)
- Bachelor of Music, an academic degree
- Beautiful music, a radio format
- Black metal, a genre of music

=== Other uses in arts and entertainment ===
- Bashir Mirza, a Pakistani painter
- BM or "Bad Manners" in video gaming, cf. glossary of video game terms#BM

== Business ==
=== Business terminology ===
- Brick and mortar or B&M

=== Businesses ===
- BM, reporting mark of Boston and Maine Railroad, a former American railway company
- BM, IATA code of several airlines, at different times:
  - Bakhtar Afghan Airlines, based in Afghanistan
  - Flybmi (formerly BMI Regional), based in the United Kingdom
  - Medsky Airways, a Libya-based airline
- Birmingham Midshires, a division of the Bank of Scotland
- Bolinder-Munktell, a Swedish tractor manufacturer, now part of Volvo
- Bolliger & Mabillard, a Swiss roller coaster manufacturer
- British Midland International, a former airline in the United Kingdom

== Science and technology ==
=== Health and medicine ===
- Bachelor of Medicine, an academic degree
- Bacterial meningitis
- Basement membrane
- Boehringer Mannheim test, a blood test performed using a glucose meter
- Bowel movement

=== Other uses in science and technology ===
- .bm, Bermuda Internet top-level domain
- Builder's Measurement or Builder's Old Measurement of ship size (18th and 19th century)

== Language ==
- Bambara language (ISO 639-1: bm), a West African language
- Malaysian language, or Bahasa Malaysia

== Military ==
- Bandmaster in the British Army and Royal Marines
- Boatswain's mate (United States Navy)
- Boatswain's mate (United States Coast Guard)
- Bravery Medal (Australia)
- Brigade major in the British Army and Commonwealth armies
- Martin BM, a United States Navy torpedo-bomber aircraft
- A US Navy hull classification symbol: Monitor (BM)

== Places ==
- Bermuda (ISO 3166-1 2-letter country code)
  - .bm, the Internet country code top-level domain for Bermuda
- Birch Mountain, location of Birch Mountains kimberlite field, Alberta, Canada
- Burma (FIPS Pub 10-4 code and obsolete NATO country code)
- Bukit Merah, Singapore
- The British Museum, London

== Other uses ==
- British Movement, a British fascist group
- Riau (vehicle registration prefix BM)
