= Basis point value =

Term in finance

In finance, basis point value (BPV) denotes the change in the price of a bond given a basis point change in the yield of the bond.

Basis point value tells us how much money the positions will gain or lose for a 0.01% per annum parallel (i.e. uniform at all durations) movement in the yield curve. It is specified for interest rate risk and quantifies the interest rate risk for small changes in interest rates.

The basis point value of a bond is roughly proportional to its duration.
