= BS =

BS, B.S., Bs, bs, or B's may refer to:

== Arts and entertainment ==
- NHK's satellite broadcaster mark, NHK-BS
- Backstage (magazine)

=== Music ===
- "B.S." (song), a song by Jhené Aiko from the album Chilombo
- Team BS, French music collective founded by La Fouine that includes Fababy, Sultan and Sindy
- Baritone saxophone, a musical instrument

=== Games ===
- BS-, a prefix for all games broadcast for the Satellaview modem via the Japanese Broadcasting Satellite system
- Bullshit (card game), a card game

== Finance ==
- Venezuelan bolívar, currency of Venezuela
- Bolivian boliviano, currency of Bolivia
- Banco Sabadell, a bank in Spain
- Banco Santander, a bank headquartered in Spain

== Places, transportation, and construction ==
- BS postcode area, in Bristol, England
- The Bahamas, by ISO 2-letter country code and license plate code
- Basel-Stadt, a Swiss canton, officially abbreviated to BS
- Beersheba or Be'er Sheva (Hebrew: בְּאֵר שֶׁבַע), a city in the Southern District of Israel
- Banská Štiavnica, a city in Slovakia with the vehicle registration plate BS
- Braunschweig, a town in Germany, also known in English as Brunswick, with the vehicle registration plate BS
- Brescia, a city and province of Italy with the vehicle registration plate BS
- Suwałki, a city in Poland with the vehicle registration plate BS
- Beijing Subway, a transit system
- British International Helicopters (IATA code BS)
- Brake-specific fuel consumption, a measure of engine fuel efficiency
- British Shipbuilders, a public corporation founded in 1977
- Building surveyor, a professional in the construction industry concerned with setting out reference points and markers

== In science, technology, and mathematics ==
=== Computing and telecommunications ===
- Bs (programming language)
- Backspace, and the backspace control character in the C0 control code set
- Bubble sort, a sorting algorithm
- Boot sector, a memory region containing machine code, generally used for booting an operating system
- BraveSentry, a clone of the SpySheriff malware program
- BotServ, an IRC bot server
- .bs, country-code Top Level Domain for the Bahamas
- Base transceiver station, or base station, a node in a mobile telephony network
- Broadcasting Satellite (Japanese), a system of Japanese communication satellites
- BellSouth, a United States telephone company

=== Medicine ===
- Bachelor of Surgery, an academic degree
- Bernard–Soulier syndrome, a rare autosomal recessive coagulopathy, that is caused a deficiency of glycoprotein Ib
- Bartter syndrome, a rare inherited disease which results in hypokalemia
- Behavioural sciences

=== Mathematics ===
- Baumslag–Solitar groups, a family of groups in mathematics
- Bronshtein and Semendyayev, a handbook of mathematics
- Brier score, a measure for the accuracy of probabilistic predictions

=== Other uses in science, technology, and mathematics ===
- Bachelor of Science, an academic degree
- Bright Star Catalogue, which lists all stars of stellar magnitude 6.5 or brighter
- Strange B meson, a subatomic particle, symbol B_{s}
- The Köppen climate classification code for a semi-arid climate

== In sport ==
- The Bs, a 19th-century cricket team
- British Shooting, the governing body for target shooting in Great Britain
- British Showjumping, the governing body for showjumping in Great Britain
- Blocked Shot, in basketball statistics, see Block (basketball)
- Blown Save, in baseball statistics, see Save (baseball)
- Oakland Ballers, American baseball team nicknamed B's

== Politics ==
- Better Serbia (Bolja Srbija), a political party in Serbia
- Nonpartisan Local Government Activists (Bezpartyjni Samorządowcy) a political party in Poland

== Chronology ==
- Bengali Sambat, used to mark years in the Bengali calendar
- Bikram Sambat, a calendar used in Nepal

== Other uses ==
- Bullshit, a phrase denoting something worthless
- Big Sister (disambiguation)
- Bosnian language (ISO 639 alpha-2 code bs)
- Broad Street (disambiguation)
- Bronze Star Medal, a United States military award
- Ordo Basilianus Ssmi Salvatoris Melkitarum (Institute of consecrated life), a Roman Catholic monastic Order
- Biuro Szyfrów ("Cipher Bureau"), a Polish cryptography and signals intelligence agency known for its work on German Enigma ciphers in the 1930s
- Boy Scouts; see scouting
- British Standards, produced by BSI Group
- British Sugar, a division of Associated British Foods

== See also ==
- B (disambiguation), where "Bs" may refer to the plural of "B"
