= BMU =

BMU may refer to:

- Baba Mast Nath University, Haryana, India
- Bangladesh Medical University, 1st medical university in Dhaka, Bangladesh
- Bangladesh Maritime University, maritime university in Bangladesh
- Basic multicellular unit, temporary structure for bone remodeling
- Battery management or monitoring unit, see battery management system
- Beachmaster Unit One, a United States Navy amphibious beach party unit
- Bi-mode multiple unit, a type of train, see electro-diesel multiple unit
- BMU, the ISO-3166 code for Bermuda
- Building maintenance unit, a device used to assist in the maintenance of large structures
- Bundesministerium für Umwelt, Naturschutz und Reaktorsicherheit, a ministry of the Federal Republic of Germany
- Business and Management University, today BMU Lebanese French University
