= BTP =

BTP may refer to:

== Politics ==
- Bağımsız Türkiye Partisi, Turkish political party
- Basuki Tjahaja Purnama, Indonesian politician
- Bharatiya Tribal Party, Gujarat, India
- Boston Tea Party (political party), active in the U.S. from 2006 to 2012

== Other uses ==
- Bandar Tasik Puteri, a town in Rawang, Selangor
- Bâtiment et Travaux Publics
- Bis-triazinyl pyridines, a class of bound ligand polymers
- Bis-tris propane, a biochemical buffering agent
- Pittsburgh-Butler Regional Airport, Pennsylvania, US, IATA code
- Buoni del Tesoro Poliannuali, Euro-denominated bonds issued by the Italian Treasury
- British Transport Police, an abbreviation for British Transport Police
