= BWP =

BWP could refer to:

- Baltimore–Washington Parkway
- Belgisch Warmbloed Paard, a Belgian horse breed
- Belgische Werkliedenpartij, the Dutch name of the first Belgian socialist party
- The Birds of the Western Palearctic, an ornithological handbook
- The Blair Witch Project, a successful low-budget horror film
- Botswana pula, by ISO 4217 currency code, for Botswana currency
- Bradley Wright-Phillips, an English association football player
- Bretton Woods Project, which monitors the World Bank and IMF
- Bridgewater Place, a skyscraper in Leeds, England
- The British Way and Purpose: Directorate of Army Education pamphlets issued during World War II
- Brutality Will Prevail, a Welsh hardcore band
- Bytches With Problems, a former female rap duo
- Baseball with Pop, baseball bat company
