= BVB =

BVB or bvb may refer to:

== Business ==
- Bursa de Valori Bucuresti (Bucharest Stock Exchange), the largest stock exchange in Romania
- BVB (Cambodia), Bopha Vibol, a Cambodian group of companies

== Transport ==
- Boa Vista-Atlas Brasil Cantanhede International Airport, Brazil (IATA code)
- Basler Verkehrs-Betriebe, the main public transport operator in the Swiss city of Basel
- Berliner Verkehrsbetriebe, the main public transport company in the German capital of Berlin
- Kombinat Berliner Verkehrsbetriebe, the former public transport operator of East Berlin, Germany
- The Bex–Villars–Bretaye railway, in Switzerland

== Other uses ==
- Bibliotheksverbund Bayern, the Bavarian Library Network and Union Catalog in Germany
- Black Veil Brides, an American rock band
- Borussia Dortmund, a German football club (contraction of Ballspielverein Borussia, the first two words of the club's full name)
- Buena Vida Broadcasting, Christian TV network in Texas
- Bharatiya Vidya Bhavan, an Indian cultural organization.
- Bube language of West Africa (ISO code: bvb)
