= Baggio–Yoshinari syndrome =

- Other names: BYS
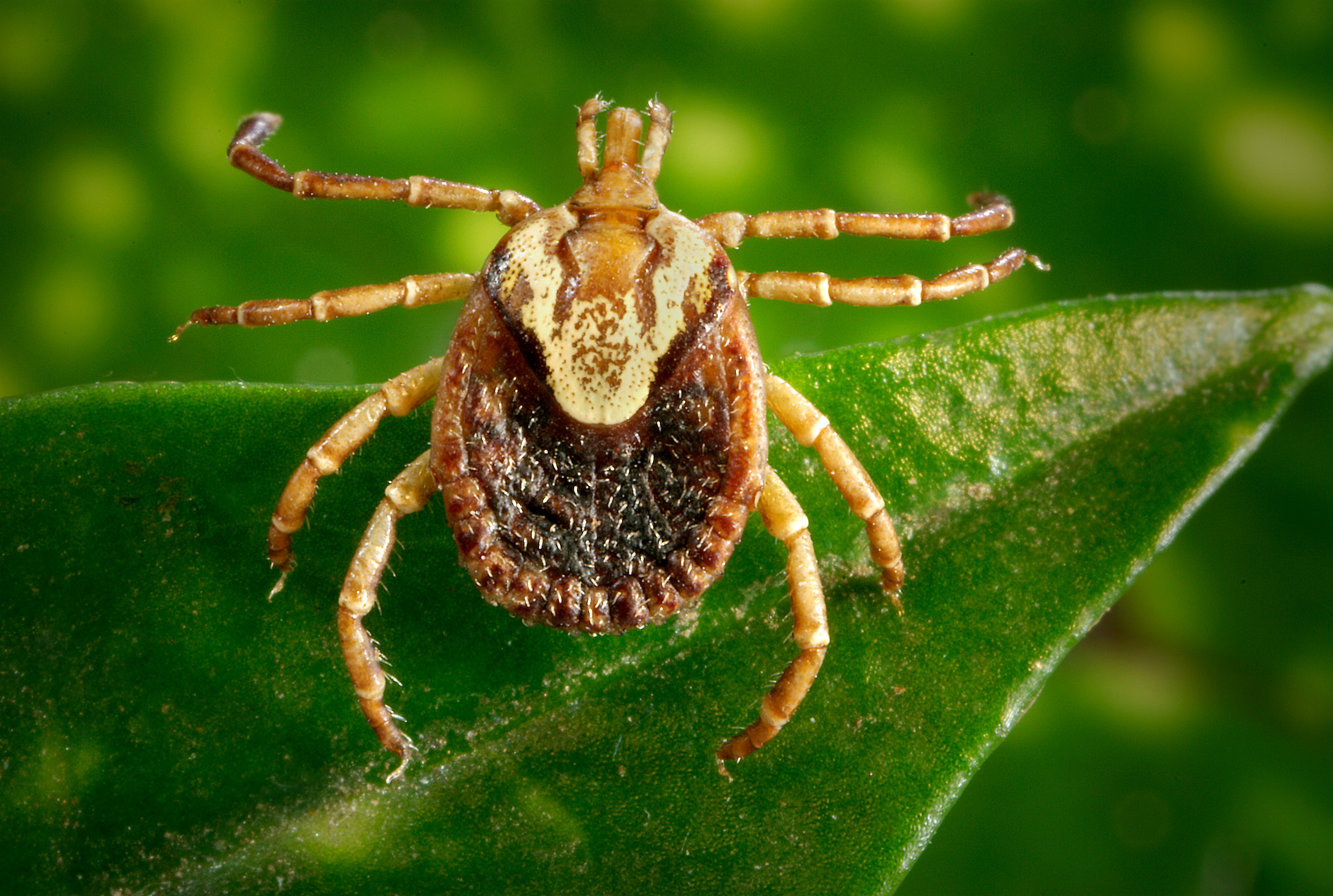
- Amblyomma cajennense transmits the condition
- Specialty: Infectious disease

Baggio–Yoshinari syndrome, formerly known as the Brazilian Lyme-like disease and Brazilian human borreliosis, is a disease transmitted by the bites of Amblyomma and Rhipicephalus genera ticks, but the organism that causes the infection is a distinct variant of the bacteria that causes Lyme with different markers that cannot be reliably detected by the standard North American tests. Clinical features resemble those of Lyme disease (LD) but have distinctive differences.

== Presentation ==
A distinct feature of the syndrome is its prolonged clinical evolution, with relapsing episodes and autoimmune dysfunction. If diagnosed in its early stages, the symptoms respond well to antibiotics. If the disease evolves to a chronic phase, it can potentially cause oligoarthritis, cognitive impairment, meningoencephalitis and erythema nodosum, with the patient at risk of developing both articular and neurological sequelae.

The neurological manifestations of BYS were first described by Yoshinari et al., including patients with peripheral neuritis, meningitis, and cranial neuritis (facial nerve palsy, diplopia, and deafness).

Likely transmission vectors of BYS belong to the Amblyomma and Rhipicephalus genera, which could help to explain all the particularities observed in BYS versus LD.

Some features of BYS also resemble those found in the Southern tick-associated rash illness (STARI, also known as Masters' disease), which is found in the Southern USA. However, there are distinctive differences; e.g., the systemic symptoms present with BYS but not with STARI.

== History ==
In 1989, Brazilian researchers Professors Domingos Baggio (an entomologist from the Biomedical Sciences Institute of the University of São Paulo), Paulo Yasuda (a microbiologist from the same institute) and Natalino Hajime Yoshinari (a physician from the Rheumatology Department at University of São Paulo's Medical School) started research on Lyme disease in Brazil, by suggestion of Dr. Allen Steere. At that time, LD was almost unknown among Brazilian physicians.

The first cases were described in Brazil in 1992 in siblings from Cotia, São Paulo that developed symptoms as a migrating redness, general flu-like symptoms, and arthritis after being bitten by ticks. Although the symptoms were similar to those presented by patients of Lyme disease, clinical and laboratory results were considerably different. Ticks of the Ixodes ricinus complex were not found at the risk areas; bacteria from the Borrelia burgdorferi sensu lato complex —that cause Lyme disease— were not found in biological fluids and tissues of the siblings. Blood analysis of the patients on electron microscopy exhibited structures resembling microorganisms of the spirochaete phylum. For these reasons, the Brazilian zoonosis was considered a new disease and named Baggio–Yoshinari Syndrome (BYS), defined as: "Exotic and emerging Brazilian infectious disease, transmitted by ticks not belonging to the Ixodes ricinus complex, caused by latent spirochetes with atypical morphology, which originates LD-like symptoms, except for occurrence of relapsing episodes and auto-immune disorders".
