= BitTorrent (disambiguation) =

BitTorrent is a peer-to-peer (P2P) communications protocol for file sharing. It may also refer to:

- Rainberry, Inc., a company, formerly known as BitTorrent, Inc., which develops and maintains the BitTorrent protocol and BitTorrent-clients
- BitTorrent (software), the original BitTorrent client
- BitTorrent DNA (Delivery Network Accelerator)

== See also ==
- Glossary of BitTorrent terms
- Comparison of BitTorrent clients, programs that download files using the BitTorrent protocol
- Comparison of BitTorrent tracker software, server programs that serve as peer rendezvous points (sometimes also web site software that hosts Torrent files)
- Comparison of BitTorrent sites, sites which index torrent files
- Torrent file, stores metadata used for BitTorrent
