= BTS (disambiguation) =

BTS is a South Korean boy band.

BTS may also refer to:

== Arts and media ==
- "BTS" (song), 2016, by Wiz Khalifa
- Beyond the Supernatural, a 1987 roleplaying game
- Between the Species, a philosophy journal (since 1985)
- Beneath the Sky, a metalcore band (2004–2014)
- Built to Spill, an indie rock band (formed 1992)
- Behind-the-scenes, any documentary film about another film or TV series' production

== Businesses and organizations ==
=== Educational institutions ===
- Baptist Theological Seminary (India), in Kakinada, India
- Berlin Graduate School for Transnational Studies, a project between the Free University Berlin, the Hertie School of Governance, and the Social Science Research Center Berlin

=== Transport bodies ===
- BTS Group Holdings, a Thai subway owner
- Bureau of Transportation Statistics, a United States government agency

=== Medical ===
- Biomedical Tissue Services, a defunct human tissue recovery firm
- British Thoracic Society, a charity for respiratory and associated disorders
- British Toxicology Society, the British professional association for toxicologists
- British Transplantation Society, a non-profit professional body related to organ transplantation in the UK

=== Other businesses and organizations ===
- BTS Group, a global consulting firm headquartered in Stockholm, Sweden
- Breaking the Silence (organization), established in 2004 by veterans of the Israel Defense Forces
- British Tunnelling Society, a learned society of the Institution of Civil Engineers
- Broadcast Television Systems Inc., a video equipment company

== Technology ==
- Base transceiver station, a telecommunication base station
- Build to stock, a build-ahead production approach
- Branch Trace Store, of Intel processors

== Transportation ==
- BTS Skytrain, Bangkok, Thailand
- Bandar Tasik Selatan station, Kuala Lumpur, Malaysia
- Basta railway station (station code:BTS), Odisha, India
- Bratislava Airport (IATA:BTS), Slovakia

== Other uses ==
- Berjaya Times Square, a skyscraper complex in Kuala Lumpur, Malaysia
- Brevet de technicien supérieur, a French qualification for technicians

== See also ==
- Behind the Scenes (disambiguation)
- Batak Simalungun language (ISO code:bts)
