= BNF =

BNF may refer to:

== Science ==
- Backus–Naur form, a formal grammar notation in computer science
- Biological nitrogen fixation
- British National Formulary, a drug reference manual
- β-Naphthoflavone, an organic compound

== Organisations ==
- British Nutrition Foundation, a charity
- Bibliothèque nationale de France (BnF), the French national library

=== Political parties ===
- Balawaristan National Front, Pakistan
- Belarusian National Front (Belarusian: Belaruski Narodny Front)
  - BPF Party, break-away group from 1993 (Belarusian: Partyja BNF)
- Botswana National Front
- British National Front

== Other uses ==
- Big Name Fan, a well-known fan
