= BHR =

BHR may refer to:

- Bahrain (ISO 3166-1 alpha-3 code: BHR), a small Arab monarchy in the Persian Gulf
- BHR Partners, Chinese-American private equity company
- Birmingham Hip Resurfacing (BHR) system, an FDA-approved device for hip resurfacing
- Blue House raid, an unsuccessful attempt by North Korean commandos to assassinate the South Korean president
- Bronchial hyperresponsiveness, a state characterised by easily triggered bronchospasm
- Business History Review, a peer-reviewed academic journal covering the field of business history
- IATA code for Bharatpur Airport
