= BRE =

BRE, Bre, or BrE may refer to:

== Computing ==
- Barren Realms Elite, a multi-player bulletin board system strategy game
- Basic regular expression, expressions used for computerized text matching
- Business rules engine, a software system to manage and execute business rules

== Places ==
- Brè, a village in Switzerland
- Bre, local nickname for Brewarrina, New South Wales, Australia
- Brecknockshire, historic county in Wales, Chapman code

== Science ==
- B recognition element, a DNA sequence
- Bloom–Richardson–Elston grading system for breast cancer
- BRE (gene), human gene

== Language ==
- BrE, common abbreviation for British English
- bre (interjection)
- Breton language (SIL language code)

== Transport ==
- Bremen Airport, Germany (IATA code)
- Brentwood railway station (National Rail station code BRE)

== Other uses ==
- Bachelor of Religious Education
- BRE Bank, a former Polish bank
- Barotse Royal Establishment, a non-sovereign monarchy in Zambia
- Bre people, an ethnic group in Burma
- Brock Racing Enterprises, automotive design firm and motor racing team
- Building Research Establishment, institution in United Kingdom
- Bustle Rack Extension, a storage bin mounted on the rear of the M1 Abrams tank's bustle rack
