= Business relationship management =

Interrelationships between business and the society

Business Relationship Management (BRM) is viewed as a philosophy, capability, discipline, and role to evolve culture, build partnerships, drive value, and satisfy purpose.

BRM is distinct from enterprise relationship management and customer relationship management although it is related. It is of larger scope than a liaison who aligns business interests with IT deliverables.

== Trends driving BRM development ==
Strategic business partners (what used to be referred to as shared services or service providers) require a common methodology to drive true business innovation and strategy. These strategic business partners (IT, Finance, HR, external providers, etc.) are converging with the business. There is one shared business strategy with each business partner accountable for portions of the overall business value achieved. Business Relationship Management Institute, Inc started promoting this business capability in 2012 with a non-profit membership community dedicated to the BRM profession.

These features include:

- Business Relationship Management focuses on business value realization through accountable business partners
- advances in the scale, scope, and sophistication of the network effect
- constant disruption as the 'new normal' business dynamic
- decentralization of knowledge and the devaluation of traditional intellectual property
- increased openness of networked knowledge
- decline of command and control management

The impact of these trends on business relationships have driven the foundation of a distinct BRM discipline.

== Overview and goals ==
BRM is implemented through organizational roles, a structured discipline, and a developed organizational capability

=== As a discipline ===
BRM Discipline — The Business Relationship Management Discipline is an effective application of knowledge, demonstrated through a set of competencies and mindsets to advance a BRM Capability.

=== As an organizational role ===
BRM Role — The Business Relationship Management Role is the set of competencies required to advance the BRM Capability. Business relationship management consists of knowledge, skills, and behaviors (or competencies) that foster a productive relationship between a service organization (e.g. Human Resources, Information technology, a finance department, or an external provider) and their business partners.

=== As a model ===
A key goal of BRM is to create a comprehensive model of business relationships, making their value explicit and measurable over time . A mature BRM model will ultimately support strategic business research and development efforts as well as tools and techniques that implement BRM principles.

The approach to the BRM modeling process is to identify and describe various aspects of business relationships in terms of:

- defined relationship types, in which each type has a specified purpose, associated roles, and a measurable outcome
- a set of processes that make up the business relationship lifecycles
- a set of principles that apply specifically to these lifecycle processes

Assets and products derived from the BRM model are meant to inform and support:

- A practice derived from applying BRM principles, analyzing outcomes, and refining over multiple iterations
- A platform derived from successful practice that further support and optimize BRM as a discipline

The BRM model will identify and categorize business relationships according to type. Each type serves a distinct purpose, defined by specific roles, functions, and activities that can be identified, measured, and analyzed. Some examples of these relationship types are business-to-business, business-to-consumer, and business-to-employee.

== BRM lifecycles ==
The concept of the business relationship lifecycle builds on charting the complex changing values of business relationships over time in contrast to simple transactional value.

Examples of BRM lifecycles include:

- A large-scale grow and sustain cycle, characterized by one-to-many and many-to-one relationships. Activities in this cycle are more or less continuous and overlapping, such as marketing, customer product support or maintenance, or online community. These have indeterminate outcomes.
- A small-scale (micro) engagement cycle, characterized by one-to-one, discrete or transactional relationships. These have discrete cycles and negotiated outcomes.

== BRM principles ==
Measurement and analysis
The goals of BRM require that its concepts and principles be identifiable and measurable. Given the model, a person should be able to identify the business relationships that they are engaged in, and measure them in terms like quantity or duration. The same holds for any aspect of BRM, such as type, role, or principle.
Purpose
Every business relationship has a purpose that requires the participation of multiple roles to accomplish. The purpose of a given business relationship is discrete and quantifiable.
Reputation and trust
The BRM model should attempt to model and quantify reputation and trust. Every relationship, and every interaction within it, contributes to reputation. Reputation mitigates risk and reduces friction within business processes. Concern for reputation incentivizes good behavior. Absence of trust will cause a business relationship to fail on the other hand trust increases efficiency and enables conflict resolution. The relationship between trust as a traditional core concept and in its emerging 'radical' form as a component of online community must be described.
Governance
The goal of effective business relationship governance is achieving both cooperation and coordination between business actors. They can rely on either contractual or relational mechanisms, or (most of the times) both, to facilitate the governance of business relationships. The BRM model needs to account for and align with models of corporate governance, including business ethics, legal constraints, and social norms as they apply to business relationships.
Boundaries
The BRM model should define the boundaries of business relationships within the larger continuum of interpersonal relationships. In addition to governance issues, the model should examine if there are optimal levels of personal connection, and whether they differ by type, role, or other attributes. The model should help define boundaries that optimize effectiveness while supporting good governance practices.
Exchange and reciprocity
The BRM model of exchange and reciprocity must extend traditional dimensions to account for not only financial exchange, but also time, money, knowledge, and reputation exchanges. These are a key feature of business relationships.

== See also ==
- Business administration
- Corporate communication
- Right-time marketing
