= BBS =

BBS may refer to:

== Ammunition ==
- BBs, BB gun metal bullets
- BBs, airsoft gun plastic pellets

== Computing and gaming ==
- Bulletin board system, a computer server users dial into via dial-up or telnet; precursor to the Internet forum
- BIOS Boot Specification, a firmware specification for the boot process
- Blum Blum Shub, a pseudorandom number generator
- Kingdom Hearts Birth by Sleep, a Disney-based video game for the PlayStation Portable

== Organisations ==
=== United Kingdom ===
- Birmingham Business School (University of Birmingham), a faculty
- British Blind Sport, a parasports charity
- British Boy Scouts, a national youth association
- British Bryological Society, a botanists' learned society

=== United States ===
- BBS Productions, a film company of early 1970s New Hollywood
- Badger Boys State, a youth camp held in Wisconsin

=== Elsewhere ===
- BBS Kraftfahrzeugtechnik, a German wheel manufacturer
- Buddhist Broadcasting System, a South Korean religious TV network
- Bahrain Bayan School
- Bangladesh Bureau of Statistics
- Baton Broadcast System, Canada
- Bhutan Broadcasting Service, Bhutan
- Bodu Bala Sena, Sri Lanka
- Bologna Business School, Italy
- Budapest Business School, Hungary
- Burma Broadcasting Service, Burma
- Burgeo Broadcasting System, a cable television company in Burgeo, Canada

== Science ==
- Bardet–Biedl syndrome, a genetic disorder
- Behavioral and Brain Sciences, a peer-reviewed journal
- Behavior-based safety, the risk reduction subfield of behavioural engineering
- Berg Balance Scale, a medical function test
- Bogart–Bacall syndrome, a vocal misuse disorder
- Borate buffered saline, in biochemistry
- Breeding bird survey, to monitor avian populations

== Titles ==
- Bachelor of Business Studies, an academic degree
- Bronze Bauhinia Star, in the Hong Kong honors system

== Train stations ==
- Bhubaneswar railway station, Odisha, India (by Indian Railways code)
- Bordesley railway station, Birmingham, England (by National Rail code)
- Bras Basah MRT station, Singapore (by MRT abbreviation)
