= BFR =

BFR may refer to:

== Organizations ==
- Brampton Fire and Rescue, the statutory fire department of Brampton, Ontario
- Bloody Fist Records, a record label
- Botafogo de Futebol e Regatas, a Brazilian football (soccer) club
- Federal Institute for Risk Assessment (BfR), a German authority in the field of food and product safety

== Products ==
- Brominated flame retardants, chemicals applied to materials to make them fire-resistant
- Magnum Research BFR, a.k.a. Biggest, Finest, Revolver or Big Frame Revolver; a model of handgun

== Medicine ==
- Blood flow restriction training
- Body fat redistribution syndrome
- Vascular occlusion or Blood flow restriction
  - Vascular occlusion training

== Transportation ==
- Biennial flight review, an external review mandated for pilots in many countries
- Big Falcon Rocket, former name for SpaceX Starship
- Blackfriars station, London, UK (station code BFR)
- Bekal Fort railway station, Kasaragod district, Kerala, India (station code BFR)
- Virgil I. Grissom Municipal Airport, Bedford, Lawrence County, Indiana, US (IATA airport code BFR)
- Blackhawk Farms Raceway, South Beloit, Illinois, USA
- Bala and Festiniog Railway, North Wales, UK

== Slang ==
- Military slang for Big Fucking Rock
- Boombox, i.e. Big Fucking Radio
- SpaceX for "Big Fucking Rocket"

== Other uses ==
- Bazigar language (ISO 639 language code bfr)
- Berkeley Fiction Review, an American literary magazine
- Breast feeding relationship, formally known as erotic lactation

== See also ==
- BFG (disambiguation)
