= Business & Decision =

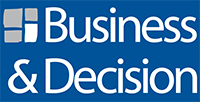
- Type: S.A. (corporation)
- Traded as: Euronext: BND
- Industry: IT services, IT consulting
- Founded: 1992; 34 years ago
- Headquarters: Paris, France
- Area served: Worldwide
- Services: IT services, business consulting and outsourcing services
- Revenue: ▲€ 249 million (2011)
- Number of employees: 2,800
- Website: www.businessdecision.fr

Business & Decision (frequently called B&D ) is an international consulting and systems integration company with its global headquarters in Paris, France. The group specialises in Business Intelligence (BI), Customer Relationship Management (CRM), e-Business with two major directions : Data & Digital.

Business & Decision has a presence in 11 countries and employs more than 2400 people worldwide. It was listed on Euronext Paris as ticker symbol BND until 2020.

== History ==
- 1992: founded by Patrick Bensabat in France
- 2001: listed on Euronext Paris' nouveau marché Euronext: BND. First international acquisitions in Belgium and UK
- 2002-2006: expansion in 12 countries including first acquisition in the United States
- 2012: 20th anniversary
- 2014: acquisition of Ceri Medical & InFact
- 2016: death of founder Patrick Bensabat
- 2018: Orange Business Services acquires majority stake of the capital of Business & Decision

== Activities ==
Business & Decision has worked for over 2100 clients globally. Some of its major activities include-

- Decision making and enterprise performance: Analytics, Business Intelligence, Performance Management and Big Data (65% of revenue);
- e-Business : Digital Business, Web Marketing, Search Engine Optimisation (SEO), on-line strategy, e-commerce, hosting and data warehouse (18% of revenue).
- Customer Relationship Management : CRM front office, marketing campaigns management, interactive marketing, analytical CRM (17% of revenue);
- Digital Transformation : Business consultancy approach and focus on innovative technologies; how synergies can be triggered within the organizations cross-departments. Hot topics are real time decision, customer DNA, fraud detection, e-beacon, omnichannel, lean process management...

== Geographical locations ==
- Belgium
- France
- Luxembourg
- Mauritius
- Morocco
- Netherlands
- Russia
- Spain
- Switzerland
- Tunisia
- United States
- Switzerland

== Key figures ==
Annual revenue
Year	€ (millions)
2004	64.3
2005	91.2
2006	142.8
2007	202.3
2008	238.7
2009	224.3
2010	237.1
2011	249.0
2012	221.9
2013	200.0
2014	204.9
2015	224.2
2016	227.6
2017	212,0

== Quotation and shareholding ==
- Company listed at Euronext Paris
- ISIN = FR0000078958 - BND
- Currency = euro
- Shareholding :
  - Founder & Family: 65%
  - Float (Euronext C): 35%
