= Brain-specific homeobox =

Protein encoded by the BSX gene

BSX

Identifiers
- Aliases: BSX, BSX1, brain specific homeobox
- External IDs: OMIM: 611074; MGI: 2669849; GeneCards: BSX

Gene location (Human)
Chr.	Chromosome 11 (human)
Band	11q24.1	Start	122,977,570 bp
Band	11q24.1	End	122,981,834 bp

Gene location (Mouse)
Chr.	Chromosome 9 (mouse)
Band	9|9 A5.1	Start	40,785,423 bp
Band	9|9 A5.1	End	40,791,353 bp
RNA expression pattern
Bgee	Human / Mouse (ortholog); Top expressed in: gonad; hypothalamus / Top expressed in: kidney tubule; stroma of kidney; epithalamus; septum of telencephalon; arcuate nucleus; pineal gland; mesencephalon; nephron; kidney tubule; More reference expression data
BioGPS	n/a
Gene ontology
Molecular function	DNA-binding transcription factor activity; DNA binding; sequence-specific DNA binding; DNA-binding transcription factor activity, RNA polymerase II-specific; RNA polymerase II cis-regulatory region sequence-specific DNA binding
Cellular component	cytoplasm; nucleus; transcription regulator complex
Biological process	regulation of transcription, DNA-templated; eating behavior; locomotory behavior; transcription, DNA-templated; positive regulation of transcription by RNA polymerase II; mammary gland involution; regulation of transcription by RNA polymerase II
Sources:Amigo / QuickGO
Orthologs
Databases	NCBI: entry; OMA: entry
Species	Human	Mouse
Entrez	390259	244813
Ensembl	ENSG00000188909	ENSMUSG00000054360
UniProt	Q3C1V8	Q810B3
RefSeq (mRNA)	NM_001098169	NM_178245
RefSeq (protein)	NP_001091639	NP_839976
Location (UCSC)	Chr 11: 122.98 – 122.98 Mb	Chr 9: 40.79 – 40.79 Mb
PubMed search
- Wikidata
View/Edit Human	View/Edit Mouse

Brain-specific homeobox is a protein that in humans is encoded by the BSX gene.

== Tissue distribution ==
In mouse it has been shown to be expressed in the telencephalic septum, pineal gland, the mammillary bodies and arcuate nucleus.

== Structure ==
Bsx is an evolutionarily highly-conserved homeodomain-containing transcription factor that belongs to the ANTP-class.

== Function ==
In the hypothalamic arcuate nucleus, Bsx has been demonstrated to be necessary for normal expression levels of the two orexigenic neuropeptides Agouti-related peptide and Neuropeptide Y.

In the pineal gland of the clawed frog Xenopus, Bsx is expressed following the circadian rhythm and controls photoreceptor cell differentiation. In zebrafish Bsx is required for normal development of all cell types within the pineal gland, including melatonin-releasing pinealocytes, photoreceptor cells and leftwards migrating parapineal cells, which in zebrafish are crucial for the establishment of brain asymmetry.
