= BFT =

BFT is the abbreviation of:

== Arts and media ==
- Brother Firetribe, a Finnish rock band
- Big Fish Theory, the second studio album by American rapper Vince Staples
- Business and Financial Times, a newspaper in Ghana
- Battle Force Tank, in the Recoil video game

== Places ==
- Bayfront MRT station, Singapore
- Bureau français de Taipei, the de facto embassy of France in Taiwan

== Science and technology ==
- Beaufort scale, a measure for wind speed
- Blunt force trauma, trauma caused by sudden impact
- Byzantine fault tolerance, in computing

== Other uses ==
- Bluefin tuna, a common name for several fish species
- Blue Force Tracking, a United States military term
