= BLW =

BLW or blw may refer to:

- Baby-led weaning, an approach to adding complementary foods to a baby's diet of breast milk or formula
- Baldwin Locomotive Works, a defunct American manufacturer of railroad locomotives
- Bangladesh Liberation War, 1971 Bangladesh–Pakistan armed conflict
- Brightline West, a future high-speed rail route
- BLW, the IATA code for Beledweyne Airport, Somalia
- BLW, the Indian Railways station code for Balawali railway station, Uttar Pradesh, India
- blw, the ISO 639-3 code for Balangao language, Luzon, Philippines
