= BDU =

BDU may refer to:

== Airports ==
- Bardufoss Airport (IATA code: BDU), northern Norway
- Boulder Municipal Airport (FAA LID: BDU), Colorado, US

== Education ==
- Bahir Dar University, Ethiopia
- Baku State University, Azerbaijan
- Bharathidasan University, Tamil Nadu, India
- Brown Debating Union, Brown University, Rhode Island, US

== Military ==
- Battle Dress Uniform, historical American camo
- Befehlshaber der U-Boote, head of the German Navy's U-Boat arm in WWI and WWII

== Other uses ==
- B.D.U, a South Korean boy band
- Bizkaia–Durango, a cycling team based in Spain
- Broadcast distribution undertakings, the legal term for Canadian multichannel television providers
- Oroko language, spoken in Cameroon (ISO 639-3:bdu)
- Data Security Threats Database (BDU), a Russian software vulnerability database
