= BRI =

BRI may refer to:

== Organizations ==
- Bank Rakyat Indonesia, a bank in Indonesia
- Banque des Règlements Internationaux (Bank for International Settlements), an international body for cooperation between national central banks
- Brewers Retail Inc., operator of The Beer Store chain in Ontario
- Brigade de recherche et d'intervention (Research and Intervention Brigade), a French anti-gang police unit

=== Hospitals ===
- Bristol Royal Infirmary, a teaching hospital in Bristol, England
- Bradford Royal Infirmary, a teaching hospital in Bradford, West Yorkshire, England

=== Research institutions ===
- Breslov Research Institute, Hasidic rabbinical publisher
- Biblical Research Institute, of the Seventh-day Adventist Church
- Biosecurity Research Institute, at Kansas State University
- Queensland Herbarium, BRI (institution code)

== Transportation ==
- Bari Airport (IATA code), Italy
- Bristol Temple Meads railway station (National Rail code), England
- Burlington-Rock Island Railroad, Texas (reporting mark), 1930-1965

== People ==
=== Women ===
- Bri (musician) (born 1994), American gospel singer
- Bri Campos (born 1994), American professional footballer
- Bri Ellis (born 2003), American professional softball player
- Bri Folds (born 1998), American professional soccer player
- Bri Kulas (born 1992), American professional basketball player
- Bri Lee (born 1991), Australian author, journalist, and activist

=== Men ===
- Bri Aronow, Member group of Crumb
- Bri Holt, American inventor and businessman
- Bri Talbot, Member group of Sore Throat

== Other uses ==
- Basic Rate Interface, an ISDN configuration
- Basketball Related Income, issue in the 2011 NBA lockout
- Bathroom Readers' Institute, credited author of Uncle John's Bathroom Reader
- Belt and Road Initiative, Chinese strategy for extending trade and transport links to Central Asia and further west
- Body roundness index, quantification of a person's body shape
- Brother Records Incorporated, the holding company and record label for The Beach Boys
- BrI, a formula for iodine monobromide

== See also ==
- Brian or Brianna (nickname "Bri"), given names
