= BKN (disambiguation) =

BKN, Inc. or Bohbot Entertainment was an American advertising and marketing company specializing in the children's market.

BKN may also refer to:

- BKN (TV station), Australian regional television station
- BKN International, a German kids TV production and distribution company
- Blackwell–Tonkawa Municipal Airport, the FAA LID code BKN
- Bohbot Kids Network, a children's programming block operated by Bohbot Entertainment
- ISO 639:bkn, the ISO 639 code for the Bukitan language
- National Security Division (Bahagian Keselamatan Negara), a senior grouping within the Malaysian government
- Brooklyn Nets, a basketball team in the National Basketball Association
