= Berkeley Hall School =

Coordinates: 34.128230°N 118.483430°W

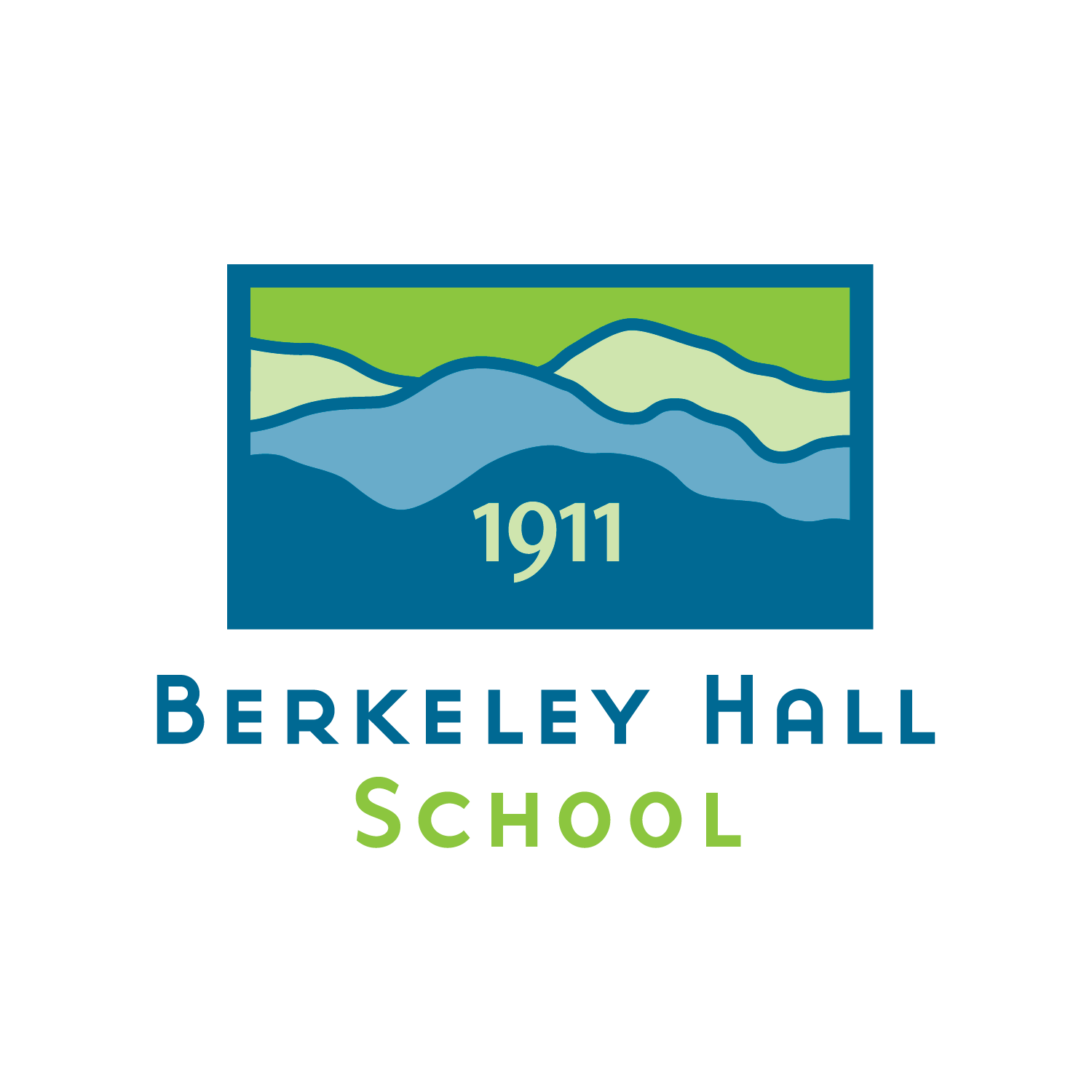

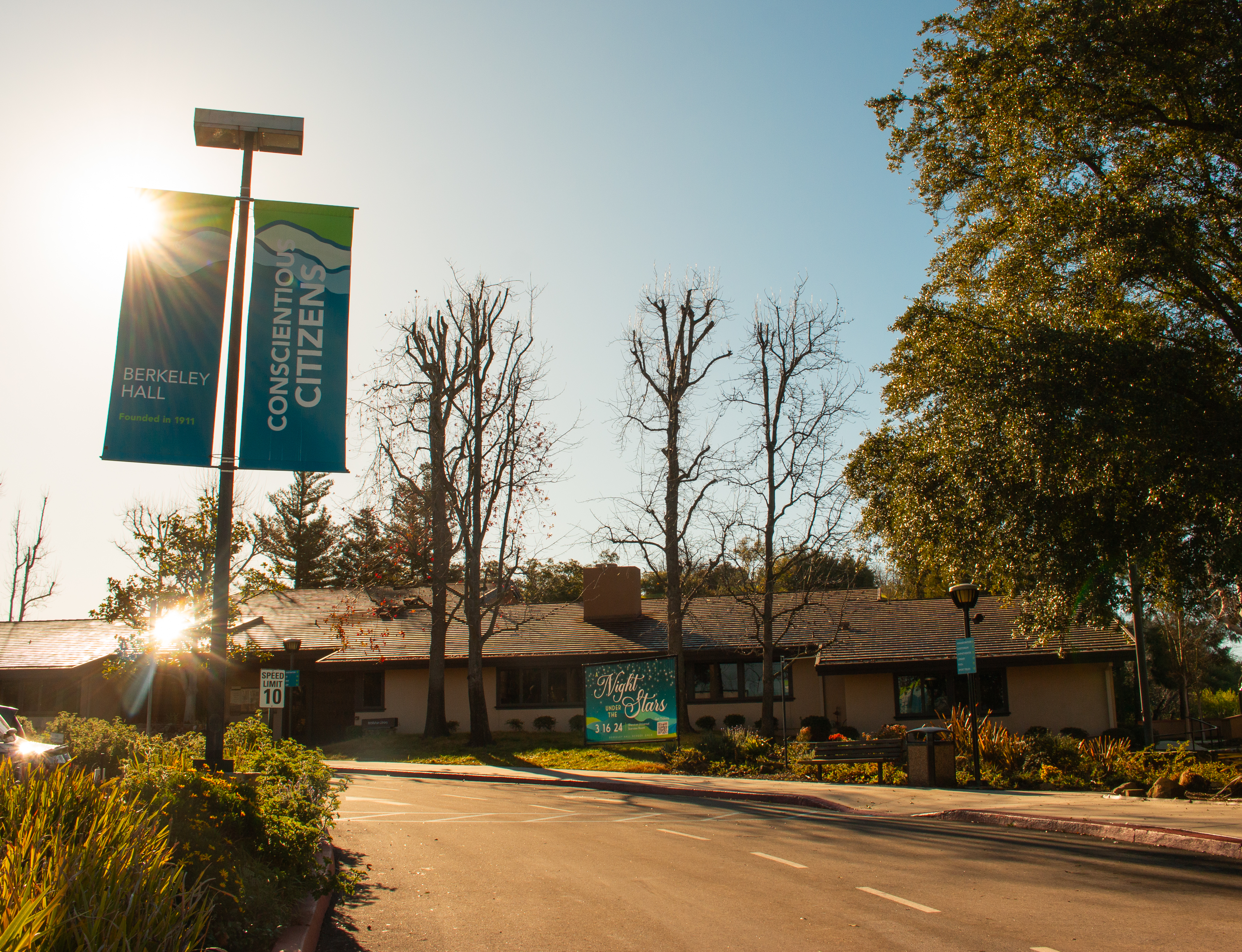

Location
- 16000 Mulholland Drive; Los Angeles, California; United States

Information
- Type: Independent, private, coeducational day school
- Motto: No limits. No labels. Lots of love.
- Founder: Leila and Mabel Cooper
- Head of School: Dr. Sarah Colmaire
- Faculty: 64 (faculty and staff)
- Grades: Nursery (age 3)–8th grade
- Enrollment: Approximately 250
- Student to teacher ratio: 8:1
- Campus size: 66 acres
- Colors: Blue and Green
- Mascot: Bobcat
- Founded: 1911
- Website: www.berkeleyhall.org

Berkeley Hall School (BHS) is a private, independent, coeducational day school in Los Angeles, California, serving students from Nursery (age 3) through eighth grade. Founded in 1911 by sisters Leila and Mabel Cooper, Berkeley Hall is the oldest coeducational independent school in Los Angeles. The school is located on a 66-acre mountaintop campus on Mulholland Drive overlooking the San Fernando Valley, and emphasizes academic excellence, character development, outdoor learning, and a growth mindset approach.

Berkeley Hall’s philosophy is guided by the motto “No limits. No labels. Lots of love.” The school’s mission is to empower students to fulfill their potential as scholars and conscientious citizens. It offers a program combining academics, creativity, moral integrity, self-esteem, and compassion.

== History ==
Berkeley Hall was founded in 1911 by educators Leila and Mabel Cooper. Leila Cooper, formerly a teacher at the Westlake School for Girls, opened the school at the urging of Westlake parents. Both founders were Christian Scientists, and while the school has never taught religion, it is guided by its founding values that resonate with its vibrant and diverse community. BHS is made up of families, teachers, and staff of all religious, cultural, national, and socio-economic backgrounds.

The school began in the West Adams district and was named after Berkeley Square, the first gated community on the West Coast. In 1913, the school moved to a larger site on 4th Avenue in the same district to accommodate growing enrollment.

In 1925, Berkeley Hall relocated to Beverly Hills, where it remained for over 50 years. The move was supported by families and friends who helped secure land and funding for the new campus. During this time, the school continued to expand its academic and extracurricular programs while maintaining its commitment to coeducation and individualized student development.

In 1976, Berkeley Hall purchased its current 66-acre campus on Mulholland Drive, and it officially opened there in 1980. The mountaintop campus overlooks the San Fernando Valley and serves students from the greater Westside and San Fernando Valley communities. The campus has since been developed to include modern classrooms, outdoor learning spaces, athletic facilities, arts and performance spaces, science labs, and makerspaces, integrating nature into the school’s educational programs.

== Campus ==
The 66-acre campus includes academic buildings, outdoor learning spaces, athletic fields, performance and arts facilities, science labs, and makerspaces. Natural areas and outdoor classrooms support environmental education and experiential learning.

== Academics ==
Berkeley Hall serves Nursery through eighth grade and offers a research-based curriculum integrating programs such as the Teachers College Reading & Writing Project and Illustrative Math. Faculty participate in the school’s Depth of Study (DOS) program, a collaborative professional learning model designed to strengthen teaching practices, ensure continuity across grade levels, and support ongoing faculty growth.

=== Philosophy and Educational Approach ===
Berkeley Hall emphasizes a growth mindset philosophy, encouraging students to view challenges as opportunities for learning and personal development. Character education, moral integrity, and social responsibility are integrated across the curriculum and daily school activities.

== Student Life ==
BHS offers a broad range of extracurricular programs, including:

- Performing arts (music, theater, visual arts)
- Athletics (team and intramural sports)
- Clubs and enrichment programs (e.g., robotics, coding, science, and service clubs)
- Community events and school traditions, such as the Annual Camp Out, Fall Festival, and holiday performances

These programs promote social, emotional, and physical development alongside academics.

== Admissions and Tuition ==
Berkeley Hall enrolls students from Nursery through eighth grade. Current tuition is approximately $39,480 per year.

== Accreditation ==
Berkeley Hall School is accredited by the California Association of Independent Schools (CAIS) and the Western Association of Schools and Colleges (WASC).

== Administration ==
Dr. Sarah Colmaire has served as Head of School since 2023.

== Diversity and Community ==
The school describes itself as an inclusive, diverse community, welcoming students from a variety of cultural, religious, and socio-economic backgrounds.
