= Bev (given name) =

Bev is a unisex given name, usually a short form (hypocorism) of Beverly or Beverley. It may refer to:

== Women ==
- Bev Beaver (1947–2025), Mohawk Canadian athlete
- Bev Brentnall (born 1936), New Zealand cricketer
- Bev Buckway (born 1954), Canadian politician
- Bev Cains (born 1938), Australian former politician
- Bev Craig, British politician
- Bev Francis (born 1955), Australian professional bodybuilder, powerlifter, and national shot put champion
- Bev Hansen (born 1944), American politician
- Bev Harrell (born 1946), Australian pop singer
- Bev Harris, American writer and activist
- Bev Hartigan (born 1967), English runner
- Bev Moon, (born 1968), New Zealand artist, poll tax descendant.
- Bev Nicholson (cricketer) (born 1975), English cricketer
- Bev Oda (born 1944), Canadian politician, first Japanese-Canadian MP and cabinet minister in Canadian history
- Bev Perdue (born 1947), American politician and businessperson, first female governor of North Carolina
- Bev Scalze (1943–2021), American politician
- Bev Smith (born 1960), Canadian women's national basketball team assistant coach and former basketball player
- Bev Wilson (born 1949), Australian former cricketer
- Bev Yanez (born 1988), American soccer player

== Men ==
- Bev Bevan (born 1944), English rock drummer, original member of The Move and Electric Light Orchestra
- Bev Harrison (born 1942), Canadian politician
- Bev Lewis (1906–1986), Canadian politician
- Bev Lyon (1902–1970), English cricketer
- Bev Risman (born 1937), English former rugby union and rugby league footballer and coach
- Bev Shipley (born 1947), Canadian politician

== Fictional characters ==
- Bev Bighead, in the animated TV series Rocko's Modern Life
- Bev Gilturtle, a box turtle in the children's animated TV series Littlest Pet Shop: A World of Our Own
- Bev Houghton, in the Australian soap opera Number 96
- Bev Tull, in the British drama series Bad Girls
- Bev Unwin, in the British soap opera Coronation Street
