= BX =

BX, Bx, and similar may refer to:

== Businesses and organizations ==
- Barnard's Express, a transportation company in British Columbia, Canada
- Base exchange, a store operated by the Army, Naval, and Air Force Exchange Service
- Berne eXchange, the stock exchange of Bern, Switzerland
- Blackstone Group (NYSE stock ticker symbol BX)
- BookCrossing, a program for sharing second-hand books
- Air Busan (established 2007) (IATA airline code BX)
- Coast Air (1998–2008) (IATA airline code BX)
- Brand Experience, which encompasses all the interactions and feelings a customer has with a brand, from initial awareness to post-purchase engagement

== Vehicles ==
- BX (sternwheeler), a boat owned by Barnard's Express
- Citroën BX, an automobile
- Bionix AFV, an infantry fighting vehicle produced in Singapore

== Science and technology ==
=== Biology and medicine ===
- Biopsy, the extraction of cells or tissues to determine the presence or extent of a disease
- Bithorax (part of bithorax complex), a genetic mutation in flies

=== Computing ===
- BX register, a general-purpose 16-bit X86 register
- BitchX, an IRC client
- Intel 440BX, chipset for Pentium II/Pentium III/III and Celeron processors
- Bidirectional transformations

=== Other uses in science and technology ===
- BX cable, a genericized trademark term for a type of AC armoured electrical cable
- BeppoSAX catalog, also called SAX and 1SAX
- Brix (°Bx), measurement unit of the dissolved sugar-to-water mass ratio of a liquid

== Places ==
- Belgium, World Meteorological Organization country code
  - Brussels (French: Bruxelles), the capital of the nation
- BeNeLux, a politico-economic union of Belgium, the Netherlands, and Luxembourg
- Berryessa, San Jose, California
- Bordeaux, France
- The Bronx, one of the five boroughs of The City of New York, New York, U.S. (also for many institutions, usually in the borough, and named for it)
- Brunei (LOC MARC code and obsolete FIPS Pub 10-4 and NATO country codes)

== Other uses ==
- BX convoys of World War II ships
- Battlecross, a rock band from Michigan
