= BIAP =

BIAP may refer to:

- Baghdad International Airport
- Biafran pound
- Bureau International d'AudioPhonologie
