= Brevard Business News =

Weekly newspaper in Melbourne, Florida, United States

Coordinates: 28°05′42.97″N 80°41′50.26″W

- Type: Weekly newspaper
- Format: Tabloid
- Owner: Adrienne B. Roth
- Publisher: Brevard Business News Inc.
- Editor: Ken Datzman
- Founded: 1981
- Language: English
- Headquarters: 4300 Fortune Place; Suite D Melbourne, Florida
- Circulation: 10,000 weekly
- Sister newspapers: Brevard Business News is an independent publication
- ISSN: 0889-5104
- OCLC number: 13920007
- Website: brevardbusinessnews.com

Brevard Business News is a weekly newspaper in Melbourne, Florida, United States, covering business news and trends for the Space Coast region of Central Florida. Coverage also includes non-profit organizations and educational institutions, health, technology and commerce, and other issues at the local and national level.

It publishes every Monday. By 1987, circulation reached 10,000.

== History ==
Fred Krupski started Brevard Business News with a partner in 1981 and served as its president and publisher. Krupski, a Native of Philadelphia, Pennsylvania, worked in journalism for several years and helped start the Orlando daily before founding the Brevard Business News. During its early years, it was published bi-monthly, but changed to weekly. The office was originally located in Cocoa but moved to Melbourne. Ken Datzman served as the editor.

Adrienne B. Roth purchased it in 1986. Krupski continued reporting on business issues and eventually founded the News Observer in Titusville, Florida, where he served as the publisher.

In 1988, Central Brevard Women's Network awarded Brevard Business News with the Eleanor Outstanding Achievement Award for making "significant contributions to women's issues, interests and financial welfare." In 2002, the Melbourne-Palm Bay Area Chamber of Commerce recognized Brevard Business News for contributions in media to the "public and the business community" at the 17th-annual Business Achievement Awards.
