= BZD =

BZD may stand for:

- Balranald Airport, IATA airport code "BZD"
- Belize dollar, ISO 4217 currency code
- Belorusskaja Železnaja Doroga, national railway company in Belarus
- Benzodiazepines, class of drugs
