= BPM =

BPM may refer to:

- Beats per minute (heart rate), the number of heartbeats detected during one minute
- Beats per minute, a measurement of tempo in music
- Body positivity movement, a movement that began in the United States to promote body positivity

== Companies and institutions ==
- Banca Popolare di Mantova, a defunct Italian bank, a subsidiary of Banca Popolare di Milano
- Banca Popolare di Milano, an Italian bank
- Banco BPM, an Italian banking group
- Bank Pertanian Malaysia, a financial institution in Malaysia
- Banque Populaire Maroco Centrafricaine, a major bank in the Central African Republic
- Bataafse Petroleum Maatschappij, a Dutch oil company
- Beardmore Precision Motorcycles, a British motorcycle manufacturer

== Business and management ==
- Business performance management
- Business process management
- Business process modeling

== Entertainment ==
- BPM (band), an American band
- BPM (Beats per Minute), a 2017 French film
- BPM (magazine), an American magazine
- BPM (Sirius XM), a satellite radio channel
- Beats Per Minute (website), a New York-based publication
- BPM (album), by Salvador Sobral, 2021
- The BPM, by Sudan Archives, 2025
- B.P.M., a B-side to "I Believe In You" by Kylie Minogue, 2004
- Ball Park Music, an Australian indie rock band
- BPM: Bullets Per Minute, a 2021 video game
- bpm a late night dance music show which was shown in the UK on ITV in the 1990's

== Technology ==
- BPM (time service), a short-wave time service of the People's Republic of China
- Beam propagation method, a numerical tool for electromagnetic analysis
- Bit-patterned media, a potential future hard disk drive technology to record data in magnetic islands
- Bruce Proper Motion Survey, a star catalogue
- Business process management, a discipline in operations management

== Other ==
- Banff Park Museum, a natural history in Banff, Alberta, Canada
- Barbuda People's Movement, a political party active in Antigua and Barbuda that seeks the independence of Barbuda
- Begumpet Airport, an airport in Hyderabad, India (IATA airport code BPM)
- Beta Phi Mu, international honor society for library science and information technology
- Border Personnel Meeting, locations along the disputed Sino-Indian territories used for international meetings
