= Birsa Seva Dal =

Political group in India

Birsa Seva Dal (BSD) is a political group in India. BSD demanded a separate Chhotanagpur state. The party had Christian influences. It was founded in 1967 by Lalit Kujur. The General Secretary was Moses Guria and treasurer was Enock Wellington Sheetal.

In 1967–1969, BSD was engaged in agitation for the expulsion of non-Chhotanagpuris from the area. BSD later left their methods, but was disintegrated in conflicts. They were instrumental in fighting for the rights of the tribals for proper and legitimate compensation of their lands in village Lohajimi area, which was to be displaced on account of construction of dam in the area, the project was later abandoned.
