= BT =

BT or Bt may refer to:

== Arts, media and entertainment ==
=== The arts ===
- BT (musician) (born Brian Transeau), American electronic musician
- BT (album), a 2000 album by Buck-Tick
- Burton Taylor Studio or The BT, managed by Oxford Playhouse

=== Fictional entities ===
- BT, a character in the television series .hack//Sign
- BT (meaning "beached thing"), a type of fictional creature in the Death Stranding game

=== News media ===
- B.T. (tabloid), a Danish newspaper
- Berliner Tageblatt, a German daily newspaper
- Bergens Tidende, a Norwegian newspaper
- Breakfast Television, a Canadian morning television news program
- The Business Times (Singapore), a financial newspaper
- Borås Tidning, a Swedish newspaper

== Businesses ==
=== Financial services ===
- BT (Wealth Management), wealth management brand within Westpac group in Australia
- Banca Transilvania, a bank in Romania
- Bankers Trust, a banking organisation

=== Public transport ===
- AirBaltic, a Latvian airline (IATA code BT)
- Blacksburg Transit, Virginia, US
- Burlington Transit, Ontario, Canada
- Brampton Transit, a local municipal bus service for the city of Brampton, Ontario, Canada

=== Telecommunications ===
- BT Group plc, parent company of British Telecom
  - BT Global Services, a division of the BT Group
  - BT Consumer, a division of the BT Group

=== Other businesses ===
- BT, a brand of Bulgarian tobacco producer Bulgartabac
- Brooktree, a semiconductor company later acquired by Rockwell Semiconductor

== Places ==
- Bhutan (ISO country code BT)
  - .bt, Bhutan's country-code Top Level Domain
- Barton County, Kansas (state county code BT)
- British Indian Ocean Territory, WMO country code

=== Europe ===
- BT postcode area, which covers the whole of Northern Ireland
- Province of Barletta-Andria-Trani, Italy (vehicle registration code)
- Bačka Topola, Serbia (vehicle registration code)
- Bayreuth, Germany (vehicle registration code)
- Bitola, Republic of Macedonia (vehicle registration code)
- Botoșani, Romania (vehicle registration code)
- Botoșani County, Romania (ISO 3166-2:RO code)
- Kherson Oblast, Ukraine (vehicle registration code)

== Science and technology ==
- Haplogroup BT, a Y-chromosome gene group
- Biotite, a phyllosilicate mineral
- BT tank, any in a series of Soviet light tanks produced in large numbers between 1932 and 1941
- BT-Epoxy, a polymer used in printed circuit boards
- Bacillus thuringiensis, a bacterium used as a pesticide
- Bathythermograph, an underwater thermometer
- BitTorrent, an Internet file-sharing protocol
- Bluetooth, a wireless connection technology

== Other uses ==
- Baronet, a title in the British honours system abbreviated "Bt" or formerly "Bt."
- Body thetan, a concept in the Scientology belief system
- Brian Taylor (Australian footballer), nickname
- Brenton Tarrant, Australian mass shooter
- BT grade tea
- The Bible Translator, academic journal
- bt, an abbreviation for "bint"
- BT tank, a series of Soviet light tanks
- Battletech, a wargaming and military science fiction franchise

== See also ==
- BST (disambiguation)
