= BGD =

BGD or Bgd may refer to:

- BGD, the Bangladesh ISO 3166-1 alpha-3 and UNDP country code
- BGD, the Hutchinson County Airport IATA airport code
- Belgrade, the capital city of Serbia
- Black Gangster Disciples, a street gang founded by David Barksdale and Larry Hoover
