= BLSA =

BLSA may refer to:

== South Africa ==
- BirdLife South Africa
- Business Leadership South Africa

== Other ==
- Black Law Students Association
- British Lumberjack Sports Association
