= Boswell Bay Airport =

- IATA: BSW; ICAO: none; FAA LID: AK97

Summary
- Airport type: Private
- Owner: U.S. Forest Service
- Serves: Boswell Bay, Alaska
- Elevation AMSL: 230 ft (70 m)
- Coordinates: 60°25′23″N 146°08′45″W

Map
- Location of airport in Alaska

Runways
Direction	Length		Surface
Direction	ft	m	Surface
4/22	2,612	796	Gravel

Statistics (1985)
- Aircraft operations: 400
- Source: Federal Aviation Administration

Boswell Bay Airport (IATA: BSW, FAA LID: AK97) is owned by the U.S. Forest Service and is located near Boswell Bay, in the Chugach Census Area, Alaska of the U.S. state of Alaska. The airfield was constructed in 1968 to serve the nearby White Alice radar site, now abandoned.

== Facilities and aircraft ==
Boswell Bay Airport has one runway designated 4/22 with a 2,612 by 100 ft (796 x 30 m) gravel surface. For the 12-month period ending August 14, 1985, the airport had 400 aircraft operations, an average of 33 per month: 63% air taxi and 38% general aviation.
