= BWR =

BWR or bwr may refer to:

- Benedict–Webb–Rubin equation, an equation of state used in fluid dynamics
- Black Warrior Review, a non-profit American literary magazine based at the University of Alabama
- Boiling water reactor, a type of light water nuclear reactor used for the generation of electrical power
- BWR, the Toronto Stock Exchange code for Breakwater Resources, a defunct Canadian mining company
- bwr, the ISO 639-3 code for Bura language, Nigeria
