= BDI =

BDI may refer to:

== Science and technology ==
- Beck Depression Inventory, a psychometric test for measuring the severity of depression
- Belief–desire–intention model, a cognitive model developed by Michael Bratman
  - Belief–desire–intention software model, a methodology and framework for programming rational and intelligent agents
- bdi (bi-directional isolation), an HTML element that isolates an inline section of text
- Big Data Institute, at the University of Oxford

== Other uses ==
- Baltic Dry Index, an economic indicator
- Bradford Interchange, West Yorkshire, England (National Rail station code)
- Brand development index, a measure used in the allocation of media, and promotion for a specific product or service
- Bundesverband der Deutschen Industrie, Federation of German Industries
- Burundi (ISO 3166-1 alpha-3 and UNDP country code)
- Democratic Union for Integration, the largest Albanian political party in North Macedonia
- Behavioural Dynamics Institute, a precursor to the SCL Group

== See also ==
- Bangsamoro Darul Ifta', an Islamic advisory council abbreviated as BDI-BARMM
- Beady Eye, a 2010s British rock group
