= BSE =

BSE may refer to:

== Medicine ==
- Bovine spongiform encephalopathy, also known as mad cow disease, a neurodegenerative disease of cattle
- Breast self-examination

== Stock exchanges ==
- Bahrain Stock Exchange, Bahrain
- Baku Stock Exchange, Azerbaijan
- Barbados Stock Exchange
- Beijing Stock Exchange, China
- Bombay Stock Exchange, Mumbai, India
- Boston Stock Exchange, Massachusetts, US
- Botswana Stock Exchange, Gaborone
- Budapest Stock Exchange, Hungary
- Bulgarian Stock Exchange – Sofia, Sofia

== Other uses ==
- Blueprint for a Safer Economy, California classification of safe practices within a lockdown economy
- Britain Stronger in Europe, a lobbying group
- Board of Secondary Education, Odisha, India
- Biological systems engineering
- Bury St Edmunds railway station (station code), Suffolk, England
- Backscattered electron (see scanning electron microscope)
- Blender Stack Exchange, a Q&A site for the Blender 3D software
- BSE (satellite), a Japanese satellite
- Bachelor of Science in Engineering, an undergraduate academic degree awarded to a student after 3-5 years of studying engineering at a university or college
- Black Sun Empire, a Dutch drum and bass group
- Bethe–Salpeter equation, an equation in quantum field theory
- Bendigo South East College, a secondary school in Victoria, Australia
- Banco de Seguros del Estado, a Uruguayan state-owned insurance company
- Sematan Airport (IATA code: BSE), an airport in Sarawak, Malaysia

== See also ==
- Creutzfeldt–Jakob disease, sometimes called a human form of bovine spongiform encephalopathy
