= Battlefield Combat Identification System =

The Battlefield Combat Identification System (BCIS) was a question and answer system, in which military combat vehicles were able to communicate via a 38-GHz electronic millimeter wave pulse. The platform was mounted on Abrams Tanks and Bradley Fighting Vehicles. BCIS was intended to reduce fratricide, which became a concern during the Persian Gulf War.

== Background ==
The development of BCIS began after the US Army awarded a contract to TRW Inc. of Cleveland in 1993. 1,200 systems were fielded to the 4th Infantry Division at Fort Hood, TX in June 1999. Production of the system ended in 2003 due to the platform's expense, which was estimated at $100,000 for each installation.

== History ==
Fratricide concerns began during the Persian Gulf War, when 35 American troops were killed by friendly fire. During this period, soldiers often used low-tech methods to communicate, such as painting inverted "Vs" on allied vehicles or waving red-lensed flashlights. Army requirements for a combat identification system were recognized by the DoD's Joint Requirements Oversight Council in March 1992.

== Operation ==
Combat vehicles carried BCIS transmitters and receivers that sent pulses of energy to one another if the vehicles engaged. The encrypted signal identified vehicles as a friend or foe.

During operation, a millimeter wave beam was transmitted from the gunner's station, interrogating a potential target prior to firing. A BCIS transponder automatically responded with a message, provided in the form of audio and visual signals to the interrogating gunner (i.e. Friend, Friend-at-Range, or Unknown). The BCIS platform included an interrogator subassembly, a transponder subassembly, an antenna, a processor, display unit, and sight ring indicators.

== Research ==
In 1995, Army Research Laboratory scientists conducted a study to improve the auditory signals of BCIS, changing notifications from pure tones to auditory icons, such as a doorbell for engaged allied vehicles. The study focused on ergonomic design of signals for quicker user guidance during emergency conditions.
