= BZP =

BZP may refer to:

- Benzylpiperazine, a recreational drug
- The IATA airport code for the city of Breezy Point, Minnesota
- Bright zinc plating, a form of galvanization
- Benzylpenicillin, an intravenous antibiotic
