= BRN =

The initials BRN may refer to:

- Bahrain, IOC country code
- Barisan Revolusi Nasional, an independence movement in Thailand
- Berne Airport, Switzerland, IATA airport code
- Brunei, ISO 3-letter country code
- Bulk Richardson number, in meteorology
- Bunte Republik Neustadt, a former micronation in Dresden, now a festival
