= BME =

BME may refer to:

== Medicine ==
- Biomedical engineering
- Bone marrow examination

== Music ==
- Bachelor of Music Education
- BME Recordings, a record label founded by Lil Jon
- Bad Meets Evil, a hip hop duo from Detroit consisting of rappers Royce da 5'9" and Eminem

== Organic chemistry ==
- Methyl tert-butyl ether, an organic solvent
- 2-Mercaptoethanol, an antioxidant also known as β-mercaptoethanol

== Transport ==
- Beaver, Meade and Englewood Railroad, a railroad in Oklahoma, US, which became a subsidiary of the Missouri–Kansas–Texas Railroad.
- Bergisch-Markisch Railway Company (Bergisch-Märkische Eisenbahn-Gesellschaft), in 19th-century Germany
- Broome railway station, National Rail code BME
- Broome International Airport, IATA code BME

== Other ==
- Best Moonsault Ever, the name of a signature move used by pro-wrestler Christopher Daniels
- BMEzine, an online magazine devoted to body modification
- Black and Minority Ethnic, a term commonly used in the UK to describe people of non-white descent
- Bolsas y Mercados Españoles, owner of Bolsa de Madrid and other Spanish exchanges
- British Methodist Episcopal Church, Protestant church in Canada
- Budapest University of Technology and Economics (Budapesti Műszaki és Gazdaságtudományi Egyetem)
