= BIH =

Bih or BIH may refer to:

- Bosnia and Herzegovina, ISO 3166-1 alpha-3 and UNDP country code BIH
- Benign intracranial hypertension, a neurological disorder
- Bounding interval hierarchy, a data structure for computer graphics
- Bureau International de l'Heure (International Time Bureau)
- An abbreviated slang form of the word "bitch"

== Languages ==
- Rade language of Vietnam (Glottolog code: bih)
- Bihari language of India and Nepal (ISO 639 alpha-3 language code bih)

== Transport ==
- Eastern Sierra Regional Airport, California (IATA location identifier)
- British International Helicopters, an airline based in England
