= BDS =

BDS may refer to:

== Companies and organizations ==
- Bergenske Dampskibsselskab, a Norwegian shipping service
- Black Dragon Society, a Japanese paramilitary organization
- Blue Diamond Society, a Nepalese LGBTQ rights organization
- Boeing Defense, Space & Security
- Boycott, Divestment and Sanctions, a political movement that advocates boycotting Israel in support of the Palestinian cause
- British Dragonfly Society, an insect conservation group
- Broadcasting Dataservices, a United Kingdom TV listings service
- Bulgarian Institute for Standardization
- League of Democratic Socialists (Bund Demokratischer Sozialisten), a former Austrian political party
- Bund Deutscher Sportschützen, Federation of German Marksmen
- Nielsen Broadcast Data Systems, a service that tracks monitored radio, television and internet airplay of songs

== Education ==
- Bedok South Secondary School, in Bedok, Singapore
- Belgrano Day School, in Buenos Aires, Argentina

== People ==
- bds, pseudonym of Andreas Thorstensson (born 1979), Swedish entrepreneur and Counter-Strike player

== Places ==
- Bryant–Denny Stadium, in Tuscaloosa, Alabama

== Transport ==
- Bois d'Arc and Southern Railway (defunct), in Texas
- Bond Street station (station code), in London, England
- Brindisi Airport (IATA code BDS), in Italy

== Other ==
- Bachelor of Dental Surgery, a professional degree
- BeiDou Navigation Satellite System, in China
- Bonde da Stronda, a Brazilian musical group
- Burnham Double Star Catalogue
- Bush Derangement Syndrome, a U.S. political epithet
- Barbadian dollar often incorrectly "BDS$", the currency of Barbados (officially ISO 4217 code: "BBD")
- BDS, the International vehicle registration code for Barbados
- BDS-1, a polypeptide
- BDS C, an early programming language compiler

== See also ==
- BD (disambiguation), any of several entities that may be pluralized "BDs"
- Boycotts of Israel
