= BCC =

BCC may refer to:

== Multi-purpose places ==
- Baltimore Convention Center, in downtown Baltimore, Maryland, US
- Belfast City Centre, central business district of Belfast, Northern Ireland
- Bessemer Civic Center, a performing arts and convention center in Bessemer, Alabama, US
- Bosmal City Center, a skyscraper and residential building in Sarajevo, Bosnia
- Brickell City Centre, mixed-use development in Miami, Florida, US
- Brunstad Conference Center, near Oslo, Norway

== Arts and media ==
=== Music ===
- Black Country Communion, an English-American hard rock supergroup
- British Carnatic Choir, a UK-based choir group
- Boot Camp Clik, a hip hop supergroup from Brooklyn, New York

=== Other arts and media ===
- The Big Comfy Couch, a Canadian children's television series
- Birch Carroll & Coyle, an Australian chain of cinema multiplexes
- The Bulletin of the Center for Children's Books, an academic journal in the US

== Business and finance ==
- Bitconnect, a kind of cryptocurrency
- Bitcoin Cash, a kind of cryptocurrency
- Bramalea City Centre, an indoor shopping mall in Brampton, Ontario, Canada
- British Chambers of Commerce, a national network of accredited Chambers of Commerce across the UK
- Central Bank of the Comoros (Banque Centrale des Comores)
- Central Bank of the Congo (Banque Centrale du Congo)
- Central Bank of Cuba (Banco Central de Cuba)

== Computing and telecommunications ==
- Bangladesh Computer Council
- Beltsville Communications Center, a U.S. Department of State facility in Maryland, US
- Blind carbon copy (Bcc:), the practice of sending an e-mail to multiple recipients without disclosing the complete list of recipients
- Block check character, a character added to a transmission block to facilitate error detection in telecommunications
- Borland C++, a C and C++ compiler used in C++Builder
- Bricx Command Center, an Integrated Development Environment for the Not eXactly C (NXC) language
- Broadcasting Corporation of China, a broadcasting company of the Republic of China (Taiwan)
- Business Controls Corporation, best known for its SB-5 Cobol application software generator

== Education ==
=== United States ===
==== American community colleges ====
- Bee County College, Beeville, Texas
- Bellevue Community College, Washington
- Bergen Community College, New Jersey
- Berkeley City College, California
- Berkshire Community College, Pittsfield, Massachusetts
- Brevard Community College, Florida
- Bristol Community College, Fall River, Massachusetts
- Bronx Community College, New York
- Brookdale Community College, Lincroft, Monmouth County, New Jersey
- Broome Community College, New York
- Broward Community College, Florida
- Brunswick Community College, North Carolina
- Burlington County College, New Jersey
- Butler Community College, El Dorado, Kansas

==== Other educational institutions in the US ====
- Baltimore City College, a public secondary school in Maryland
- Bay City Central High School, a high school in Michigan
- Bethesda-Chevy Chase High School, a public school in Montgomery County, Maryland
- Bethune-Cookman College, a historically black college in Daytona Beach, Florida

=== Educational institutions elsewhere ===
- Bacolod Christian Center, a preschool in Negros Occidental, Philippines
- Ballarat and Clarendon College, a K–12 school in Ballarat, Victoria, Australia
- Bangkok Christian College, a private school in Thailand
- Barbados Community College
- Barisal Cadet College, one of the Cadet Colleges of Bangladesh
- Barrie Central Collegiate Institute, a high school in Barrie, Ontario, Canada
- Bicester Community College, Oxfordshire, England
- Brindabella Christian College, a Christian primary through senior college in Australian Capital Territory

== Local governments ==
- Bangalore City Corporation, the governing council for Bangalore
- Bankstown City Council
- Belfast City Council
- Birmingham City Council
- Boston City Council
- Brisbane City Council, the governing council for Brisbane
- Bristol City Council, the governing body of Bristol, UK
- Buffalo Common Council, the legislative branch of the Buffalo, New York municipal government
- Orange County Board of County Commissioners, the governing body of Orange County, Florida

== Medicine ==
- Basal-cell carcinoma, the most common skin cancer
- Burkholderia cepacia complex, a bacterial pathogen
- Behavior change communication
- Breast Cancer Campaign, a UK-based breast cancer charity providing funding for medical research
- Breast Cancer Care, a UK-based breast cancer charity providing information and support

== Political organizations ==
- Blue Collar Caucus, an American Democratic Party caucus created in 2016
- Blue Collar Conservativism, a British Conservative Party created in 2019

== Religion ==
=== Christian ===
- Beaver Creek Camp, a Salvation Army camp in Saskatchewan, Canada
- Boston Church of Christ, a part of International Churches of Christ
- Botswana Council of Churches
- Bristol Community Church, a charismatic church in Kingswood, Bristol, England
- Brunstad Christian Church, a worldwide evangelical non-denominational Christian church
- By Common Consent, a prominent Mormon blog

=== Other religions ===
- Beth Chayim Chadashim, a Jewish synagogue in Los Angeles, California
- Buddhist Cultural Centre, Sri Lanka

== Sports ==
- BCC Lions, a Nigerian football team
- Death Riders, a professional wrestling stable in All Elite Wrestling formerly known as the Blackpool Combat Club

== Transportation ==
- Bear Creek 3 Airport (IATA airport code BCC), Bear Creek, Yukon-Koyukuk, Alaska, US
- Beccles railway station (National Rail station code BCC), England, UK

== Other places and organizations ==
- BCC (store) (Bakker Cash & Carry), a former electrical retailer based in the Netherlands
- Baden-Coțofeni culture, an archaeological culture in Europe
- Bamburi Cement, in Kenya
- Batam City Condominium, a skyscraper in Indonesia
- Big Cottonwood Canyon, a canyon in the Wasatch Range near Salt Lake City, Utah, US
- Boise Cascade Corporation, an American pulp and paper company
- Boonville Correctional Center, a medium security state penitentiary in Missouri, US
- Brazilian Cultural Center, a mission within several Brazilian diplomatic posts
- British Colour Council, a defunct industry standards organization
- California Bureau of Cannabis Control, the state regulator

== Other ==
- Balochi language, based on the ISO code for Southern Balochi (ISO 639 language code bcc)
- Body-centered cubic, a form of atomic arrangement in a crystal lattice
- Border Crossing Card, a document that allows limited entry into the US by visitors

== See also ==
- B2C, business-to-consumer
- BC2 (disambiguation)
- BCCS (disambiguation)
- BBCC (disambiguation)
- BBC (disambiguation)
- BC (disambiguation)
