= BCCS =

BCCS may refer to:

== Places ==
- Battle Creek Cypress Swamp, Calvert County, Maryland, USA

=== Schools ===
- Bay City Christian School, Green Bay, Wisconsin, USA
- Beaver County Christian High School (BCCS), Beaver Falls, Pennsylvania, USA
- Bernard Constant Community School, James Smith Cree Nation, Saskatchewan, Canada
- Belfast Community Circus School, Belfast, Northern Ireland
- Bristol Cathedral Choir School, Cabot, Bristol, England, UK

== Groups, organizations, companies ==
- British Columbia Coast Steamships Service (BCCS, BCCSS, BCCSSS), British Columbia, Canada
- British Consortium of Comics Scholars, in comics studies
- Butler Cave Conservation Society, Burnsville Cove, Virginia, USA

=== Government departments ===
- Board of Commissioners of Currency, Singapore (BCCS)
- Brunei Climate Change Secretariat, see climate change in Brunei

== Military ==
- Basic Close Combat Skills, basic skills for close-quarters battle; see Defence School of Transport
- Battle Command Common Services, Strategic Mission Command, Project Manager Mission Command, United States Army

== Other uses ==
- Behaviour Change Counselling Scale

== See also ==
- BCC (disambiguation), for the singular of BCCs
- BCS (disambiguation)
