= Nazira (name) =

Nazira or Nadhira is a feminine given name and surname of Arabic origin. Notable people with the name include:

== Given name ==
=== Nadhira ===
- Nadhira Al Harthy (1977–2026), Omani civil servant and mountaineer
- Nadhira Mohamed (born 1989), Spanish-Sahrawi activist and actress

=== Nazira ===
- Nazira Abdula (born 1969), Mozambique pediatrician and politician
- Nazira Aytbekova, Kyrgyz television presenter
- Nazira Zain al-Din (1908–1976), Lebanese scholar
- Nazira Jumblatt, (1890–1951), Lebanese political figure
- Nazira Karodia, South African chemist
- Nazira Farah Sarkis (born 1962), Syrian politician

== Surname ==
- Ashley Nazira (born 1995), Mauritian footballer

== Fictional characters ==
- Al-Nadirah, a legendary figure known in Persian as Nazira
- Nazira Hashim, one of the characters in the 2010 Colombian telenovela El Clon (TV series)

== See also ==
- Nazira (disambiguation)
