= BCA =

BCA may refer to:

== Commerce ==
- Bangladesh Caterers Association UK, the umbrella organisation of British-Bangladeshi restaurants
- Bank Central Asia, a private bank in Indonesia
- Boeing Commercial Airplanes, a division of The Boeing Company
- Book Club Associates, a defunct mail-order and online book seller
- British Car Auctions (now the Constellation Automotive Group) a used vehicle marketplace
- Broadcasting Company of America, a former American Telephone & Telegraph Company subsidiary
- Business Council of Australia, an industry association of chief executives
- Civilian Board of Contract Appeals, a US government agency
- Model Business Corporation Act, promulgated by American Bar Association
- Broadcasting Corporation of Abia State

== Education ==
- Bachelor of Computer Application, an academic degree
- Bergen County Academies, a magnet high school in New Jersey, US
- Botswana College of Agriculture
- Brethren Colleges Abroad, a non-profit education organization

== Organizations ==
- British Cartoonists' Association
- British Chiropractic Association
- Buddhist Churches of America
- Building and Construction Authority, a Singapore government statutory board
- Minnesota Bureau of Criminal Apprehension, an investigative law enforcement agency

== Places ==
- Boston Center for the Arts, in Massachusetts, US
- Belfast City Airport, Northern Ireland
- British Central Africa, a former British protectorate occupying the same area as present-day Malawi

== Sports ==
- Badminton Confederation of Africa
- Barbados Cricket Association
- Billiard Congress of America
- Bihar Cricket Association
- Black Coaches & Administrators, a North American non-profit organization
- British Caving Association
- British Cheerleading Association
- British Chess Association, replaced by the British Chess Federation in 1904
- BC Augsburg, a defunct German association football club
- BC Aichach, a German association football club

== Science ==
- Bicinchoninic acid
- Bicinchoninic acid assay, a procedure to determine the concentration of protein in a solution
- Branched-chain amino acid
- Binary collision approximation, a heuristic used in simulations of ions passing through solids

== Other uses ==
- British Citizen Awards, for individuals doing extraordinary work in their community
- Breast cancer awareness
- Burst cutting area, part of a DVD, HD DVD or Blu-ray disc
- BCA-TV, a defunct Irish pirate television station
