= BC-1 =

BC-1, BC.1, BC1, BC 1 or variant may refer to:

- North American T-6 Texan, an aircraft, first model supplied to the USAAC
- North American BC-1A, an aircraft
- Backcrossing, in genetics
- BC1, Paralympic boccia classification
- Battlefield: Bad Company, a video game
- British Columbia Highway 1, a freeway
- Global News: BC 1, a TV station

== See also ==
- 1 BC
- BCA (disambiguation)
- BCI (disambiguation)
- BC (disambiguation)
- BC2 (disambiguation)
