= Ala-Too International University =

University in Bishkek, Kyrgyzstan

Coordinates: 42°51′21.6″N 74°40′52.4″E

- Международный университет «Ала-Тоо»
- Former name: International Atatürk-Alatoo University
- Motto in English: Gateway to the world!
- Established: 1996
- Undergraduates: 5,000
- Location: 1/8 Ankara Street, Bishkek, Chüy Region, Kyrgyzstan
- Website: alatoo.edu.kg

The Ala-Too International University (Russian: Международный университет «Ала-Тоо»; Kyrgyz: «Ала-Тоо» Эл аралык университети), formerly known as the International Atatürk-Alatoo University, is a private university in Bishkek, Kyrgyzstan, established in 1996. The university offers undergraduate, master's, and doctoral degree programs.

English is the primary medium of instruction at the university. Some classes are taught in Russian, while others are offered in Turkish.

The university was established by the Sebat Educational Foundation and was affiliated with the Gulen Movement. Following the failed 2016 Turkish coup d'état attempt, which the Turkish government attributed to the movement, the university was renamed Ala-Too International University. It also appointed a Kyrgyz rector and increasingly repositioned itself as a local institution.

== History ==
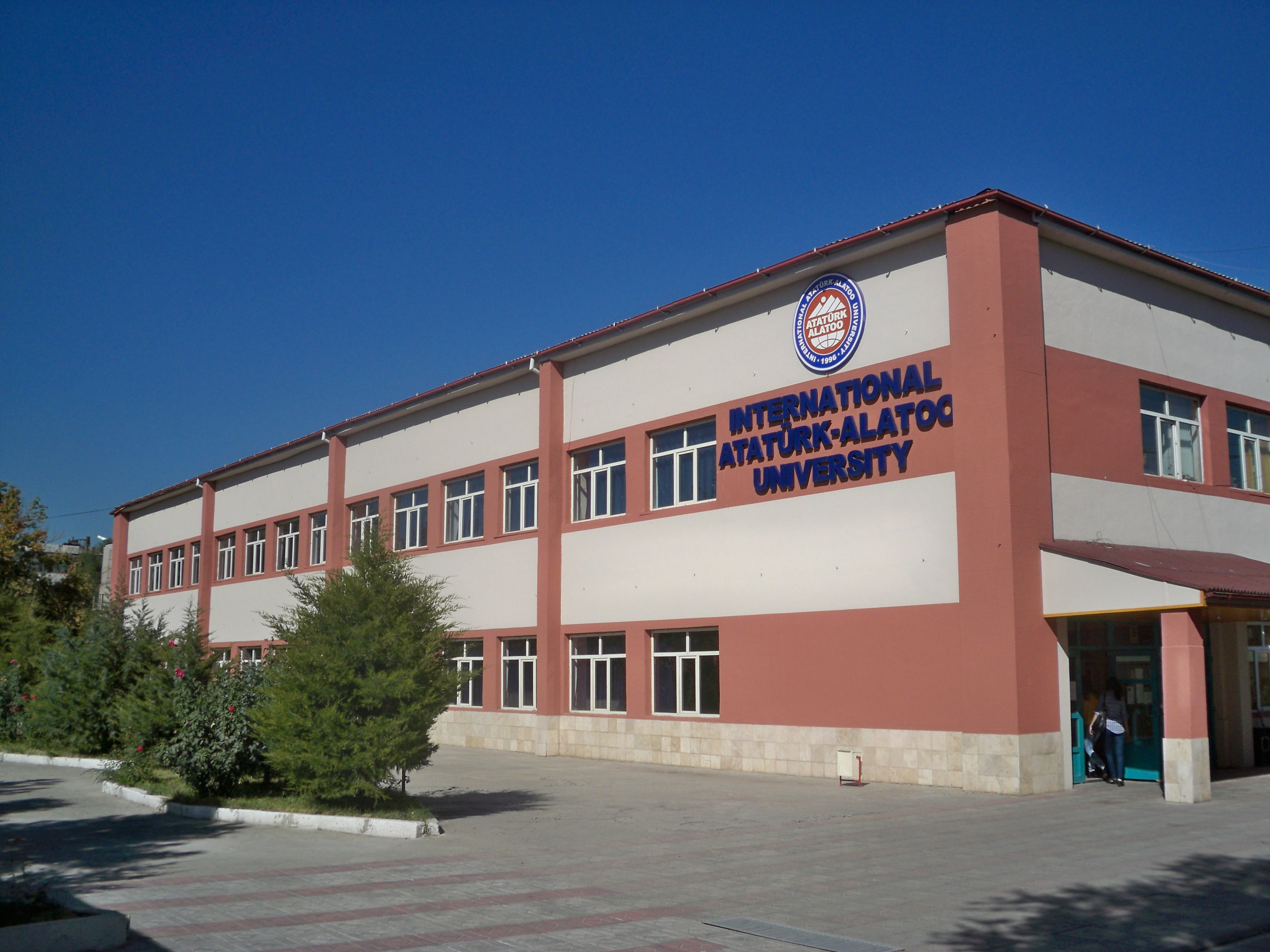
The Ala-Too International University was known as the International Atatürk-Alatoo University until 2016

The Ala-Too International University was established in 1996 as the International Atatürk-Alatoo University by the Sebat Educational Foundation, which was affiliated with the Gülen movement inspired by the teachings of Fethullah Gülen.

Following the 2016 Turkish coup d'état attempt, which the Turkish government attributed to the Gülen movement, the administration of Turkish president Recep Tayyip Erdoğan called on Kyrgyzstan to close educational institutions affiliated with the movement. The Kyrgyz government, however, declined to do so. In February 2017, the Turkish government announced that diplomas issued by the Ala-Too International University would no longer be recognized in Turkey.

The university was subsequently renamed from the International Atatürk-Alatoo University to Ala-Too International University. The Sebat Educational Foundation, which operates the university and 35 other educational institutions in Kyrgyzstan, was also renamed the Sapat Educational Foundation (with sapat meaning "quality" in Kyrgyz).

In 2026, the university celebrated its 30th anniversary. To mark the occasion, it introduced a new visual identity, including a redesigned logo.

== Academics ==
The Ala-Too International University has the following departments and programs:

=== Faculty of New Technologies ===
- Computer science
- Electronics and nanoelectronics engineering
- Applied mathematics and IT

=== Faculty of Social Sciences ===
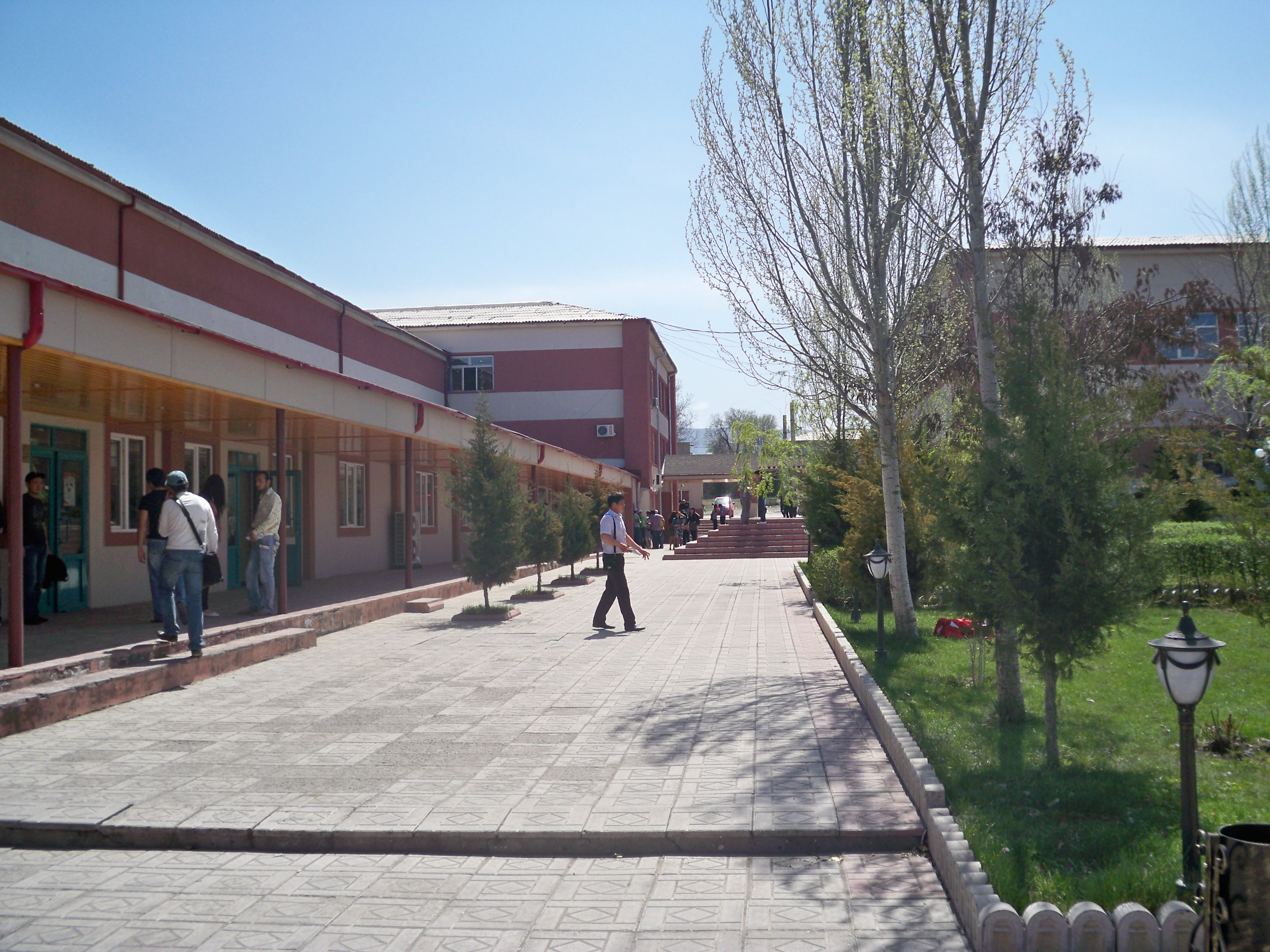
Main campus of the Ala-Too International University

- Turkology
- Chinese language and translation
- Simultaneous translation
- English language and literature
- Pedagogy
- Psychology
- Journalism

=== Faculty of Economics and Administrative Sciences ===
- World economy and international business
- International relations
- Management
- Finance and banking
- Law
- Accounting and audit
- Industrial engineering

=== Faculty of Medicine ===
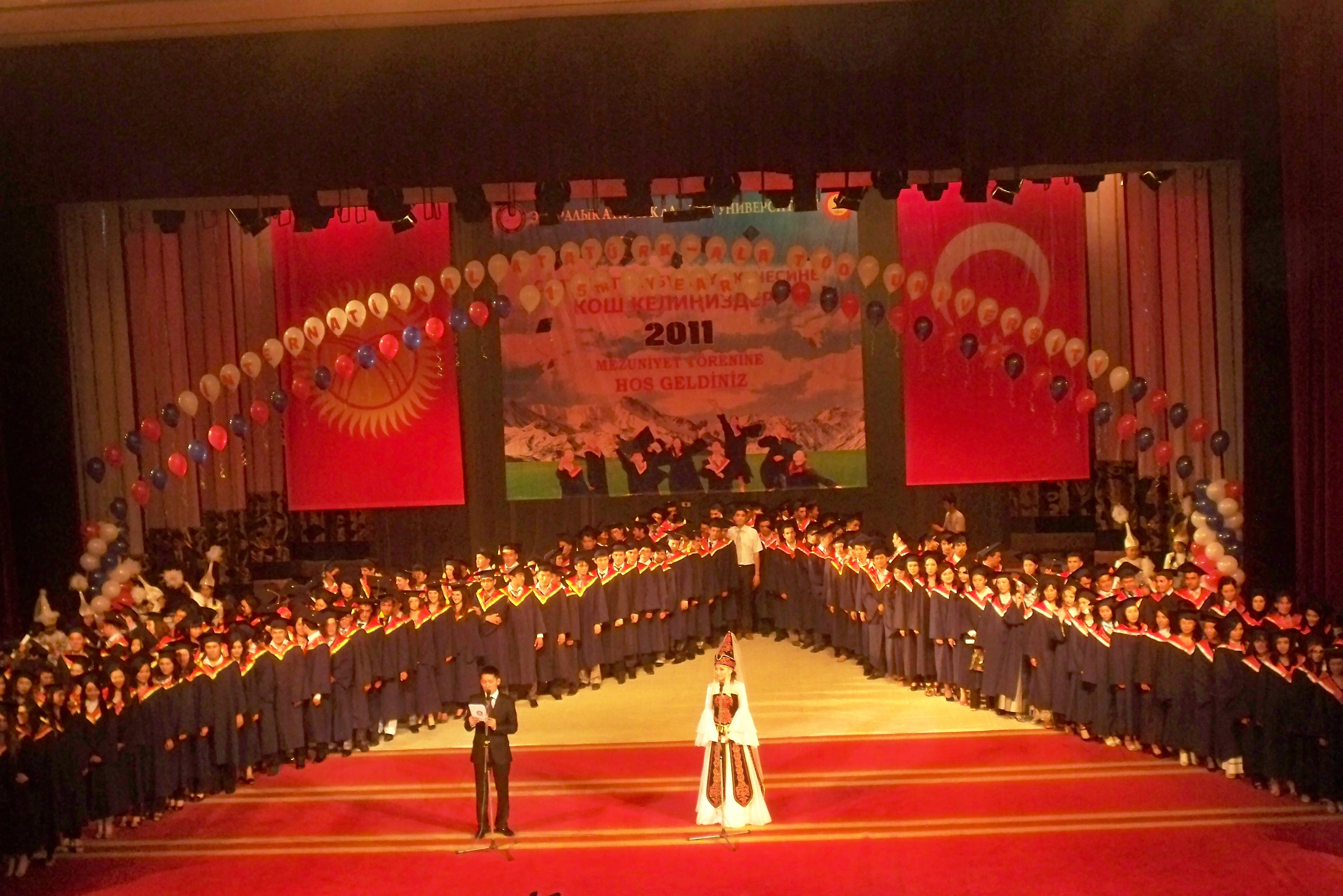
Ala-Too International University graduation ceremony, Class of 2011

- General medicine
- MD, MBBS (5Year program)
- pediatrics

=== Vocational Education ===
- Economics and accounting
- Marketing
- Computer systems and complexes
- Software engineering
- Design

=== Distance Learning Center ===
- Management
- Finance and Banking & Accounting
- Accounting, Analysis and Audit
- Internatıonal Economy and Business
- Pedagogy

== Notable alumni ==
- Nazira Aytbekova, TV presenter and actress
