= Nazira Karodia =

South African-British chemist

Nazira Karodia MBE CChem FRSC
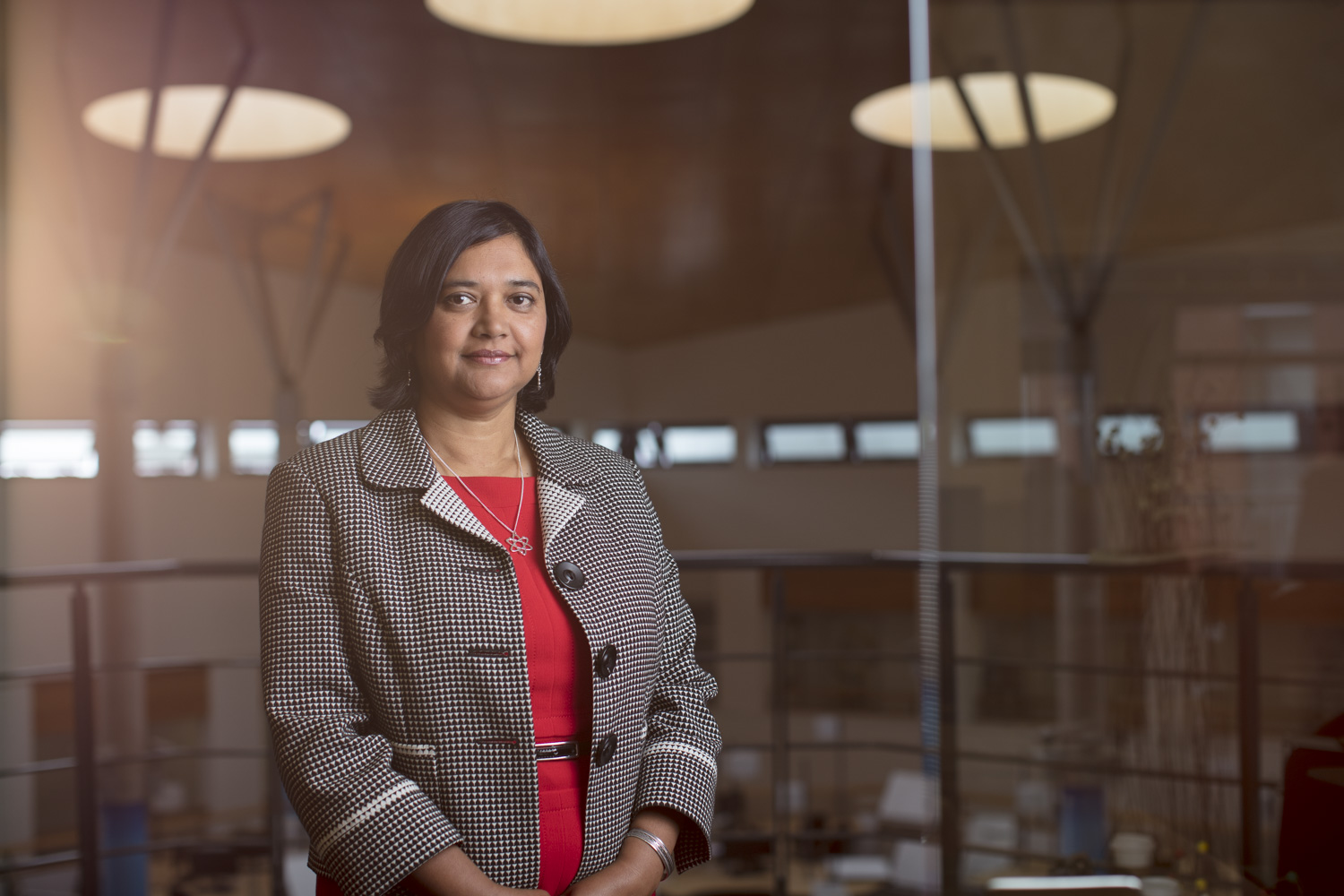
- Education: University of Natal; University of St Andrews (PhD)
- Scientific career
- Fields: STEM education Organic synthesis
- Workplaces: University of Florida; University of Bradford; University of Wolverhampton
- Thesis: Preparation, structure and reactivity of some new types of stabilised phosphorus ylides (1996)
- Doctoral advisor: Alan Aitken
- Website: www.wlv.ac.uk/about-us/our-staff/nazira-karodia/

Nazira Karodia MBE CChem FRSC is a chemist, Professor of Science Education and Deputy Vice Chancellor at Edinburgh Napier University (2021–). She was previously Pro-Vice Chancellor for Regional Engagement at the University of Wolverhampton. She works on organic synthesis, green chemistry, heterocyclic compounds and science education.

== Early life and education ==
Karodia was born and grew up in South Africa under apartheid. Like most people not of European origin, she suffered from racial segregation during her schooling. She was able to study chemistry at the University of Natal, which had been only for white people, and she graduated in 1990. She left South Africa in 1992. Karodia completed her PhD at the University of St Andrews, working on phosphorus ylide supervised by Alan Aitken in 1995.

== Career and research ==
Karodia joined the University of Florida as a fellow in the Centre for Heterocyclic Chemistry where she worked on developed Benzothiazines and Benzotriazoles. Karodia was appointed senior lecturer at the University of Bradford and made director for STEM in 1998. Here Karodia developed her interest in science education and science outreach programs that looked to benefit the local community. She was a senior member of the Higher Education Funding Council for England (HEFCE) STEM programme, where she was made Regional Director (Yorkshire, Humber and North East) of the National HE STEM programme. Her chemistry research focused on ionic liquids and liquid crystalline polymers. Karodia is part of the European Union funded GENOVATE project: Transforming organisational culture for gender equality in research and innovation. She is also working on programmes to promote careers in science and engineering, especially for students from underrepresented parts of the community.

Since 2021 she has held the position of Deputy Vice Chancellor at Edinburgh Napier University. Prior to this she worked at the University of Wolverhampton where she was Pro Vice Chancellor Regional Engagement (February 2020 – July 2021), Dean of the Faculty of Science and Engineering (February 2016 – January 2020) and Professor of Science Education. She has partnered with the Doaba Group of Colleges. In 2018 she launched a new partnerships health science course.

== Awards and honours ==
Karodia received a commendation from the National Educational Opportunities Network (NEON) in 2015 for Outstanding Contribution to Widening Access. She was selected as one of the Royal Society of Chemistry's Top 175 Faces of Chemistry in 2016. In 2017 she was honoured at the ShruthiUK Birmingham Thyagaraja Festival with a Women-in-Science award. In 2015 she was elected a Fellow of the Royal Society of Chemistry (FRSC).

Karodia was appointed Member of the Order of the British Empire (MBE) in the 2022 New Year Honours for services to the chemical sciences.

== Personal life ==
Karodia has twin daughters, both of whom studied physics at university. She lost one twin to sickle cell disease in 2012. The University of York, where she was a student, have an award in her honour.
