= London Cheerleaders Zoo Riot =

Cheerleading team in London, England

- Sport: Cheerleading and competition dance
- Founded: 2008
- Based in: London United Kingdom
- Colors: Columbia blue, white, red and yellow
- Owner: Jessica Zoo
- Championships: BCA Grand National Champions 2014
- Website: londoncheerleaders.co.uk

London Cheerleaders Zoo Riot (previously known as London Cheerleaders Zoo Fever) are a professional and competitive cheerleading team in London, established in 2008 by Jessica Zoo. Studies in 2010 showed that 37% of schools in the UK (four in ten) offered Cheerleading as part of the physical education curriculum (figures published by the UK Department of Education in September 2010). This number has only been increasing since, making the UK one of the fastest-growing competitive cheerleading communities worldwide. The London cheerleading team gained popularity with the release of a cheerleading fitness DVD in 2011, Cheerobics, and have been featured on a number of TV shows and commercials since 2008. In mid-2016, the team was renamed London Cheerleaders Zoo Riot due to a merger between Zoo Fever & Zumba Riot.

== Awards ==
London Cheerleaders Zoo Riot hold the 2014 Grand National Champion title at the British Cheerleading Association for Dance.

== Publicity ==
London Cheerleaders Zoo Riot have been featured on a number of UK and international TV shows, including A League of Their Own Game Changers, BT Sport, Britain's Got More Talent Sport Relief and Got to Dance. The team also featured in a number of music videos including Black Kids "I'm Not Gonna Teach Your Boyfriend How to Dance with You", Molly Beanland's "Real Life", H&M’s Merry ‘Happy Merry’ video with Katy Perry, and Andy Burrows "Because I Know That I Can". Over the years, Zoo Riot has also been covered in the press for the creation of their cheerleading fitness class Cheerobics®. Features have included the Dr. Oz Show, The Mirror, Daybreak, Grazia, Cosmopolitan and among others.

== Location ==
The London Cheerleaders Zoo Riot train at their gym in Waterloo, London
