= Birmingham Thyagaraja Festival =

- Genre: Carnatic
- Locations: Solihull, England
- Founders: ShruthiUK
- Website: www.shruthiuk.com/birmingham-thyagaraja-festival/

Birmingham Thyagaraja Festival is an annual Carnatic culture musical event that takes place in Solihull in UK. It is conducted by the south Asian non-profit organization ShruthiUK. The festival is named after Saint Tyagaraja, a prominent 18th-century Indian composer of Carnatic music.

== Affiliations ==
- In 2018, the festival helped raise funds for the British Heart Foundation to help fund research into the prevention, diagnosis and treatment of heart disease.
