= Oli Khan =

Bangladeshi-born British restaurateur and chef

Oli Khan MBE, FRSA, PHF
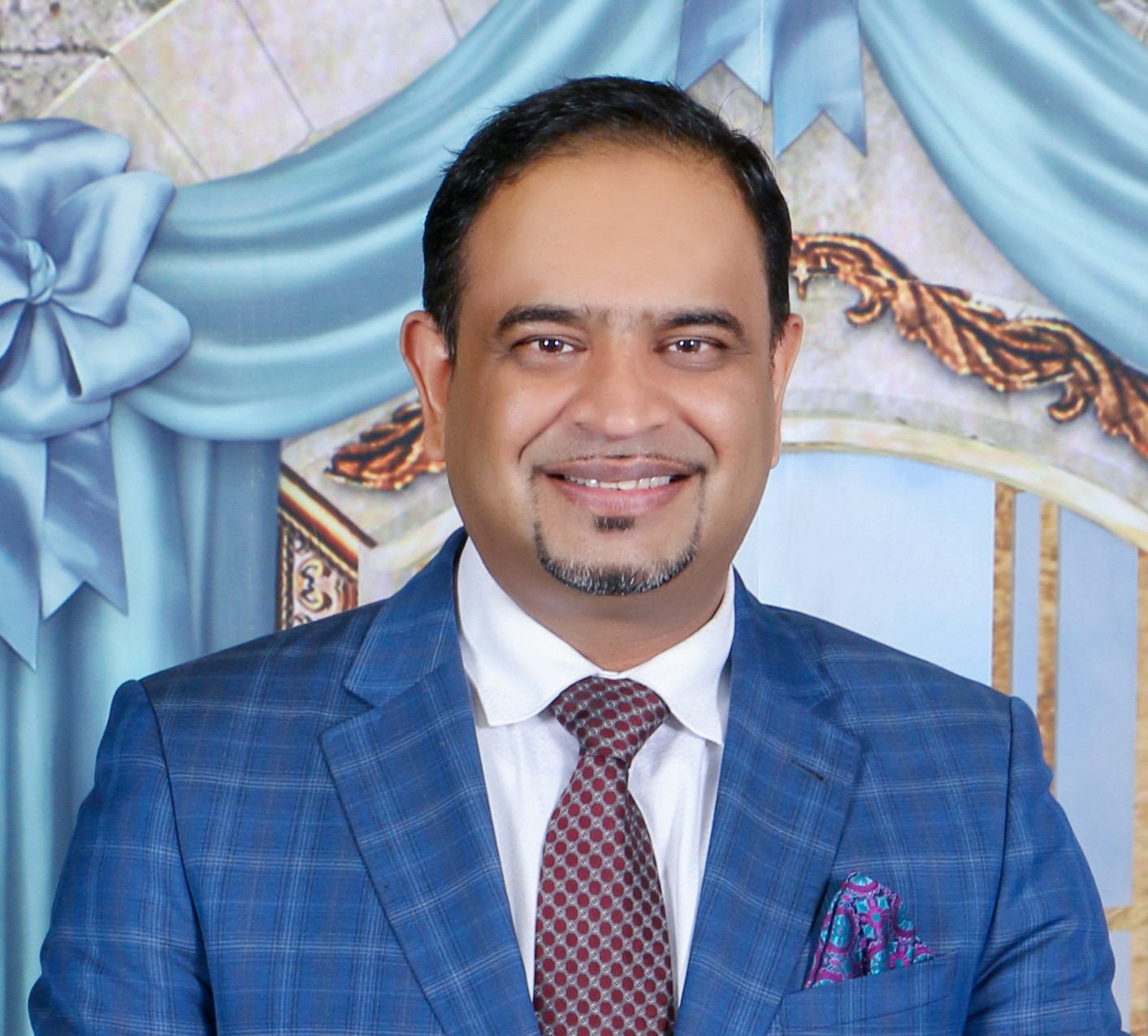
- Born: অলি খান; 18 June 1973 (age 53); Rajnagar, Moulvibazar, Sylhet, Bangladesh
- Culinary career
- Cooking style: Indian/Bangladeshi cuisine Fusion cuisine
- Current restaurants
- Surma Takeaway; Spice Rouge
- Awardss
- MBE; BCA Caterer of the Year (2010)

Oli Khan MBE, FRSA (Bengali: অলি খান) is a British-Bangladeshi chef and restaurateur. Khan operates the restaurants Surma Takeaway and Spice Rouge in Stevenage.

Khan and the team of Surma Takeaway Stevenage hold the Guinness World Record for cooking the largest onion bhaji. He received his MBE (Member of the British Empire) title at the Queen's Birthday Honours for 2020.

== Early life ==
Khan grew up in the Sylhet, Moulvibazar, Rajnagar region of northeastern Bangladesh. He moved to the UK with his mother and siblings to join his father in late 1980s. His father Late Alhaj Ayub Ali Khan was a businessman and runs several family business of curry houses in Kent, in Bedfordshire and in London.

== Career ==
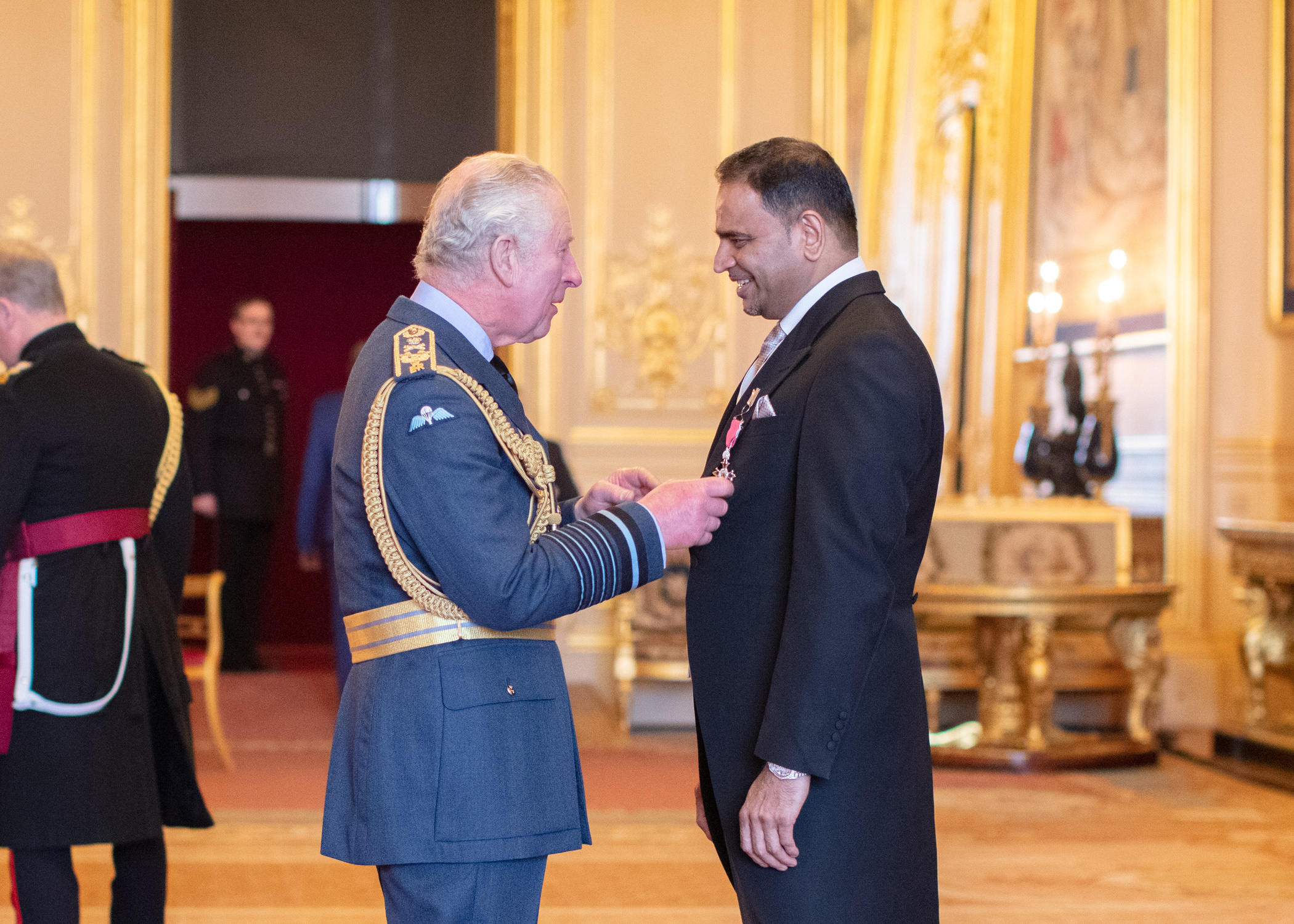
Khan receiving his MBE from King Charles III

Khan opened his first restaurant, Tandoori Knight, at the age of 17. At the age of 23, he opened Kismet, his first curry house, with his brother-in-law in Linlithgow in 1995. Khan sold Kismet and moved south of Linlithgow after his father's death from cancer.

Khan eventually became the owner of some curry houses in Stevenage and Luton. Surma Takeaway was opened in 2002. Stopsley Surma was also opened, and Spice Rouge, which was formerly the White Hart pub until Khan bought and converted it into a curry house in 2010.

Khan served as the BCA's Senior Vice President and Secretary General at different points in his career. He has also held the positions of London Regional President and Director of the UKBCCI.

Prior to the UK's withdrawal from the EU, Khan spoke to several media outlets such as CNN, Al Jazeera, The Independent, and the Wall Street Journal about the crisis faced by British curry houses and the potential effects of Brexit on the curry industry.

In February 2020, Khan and his team at Surma Takeaway also broke the Guinness World Record for largest onion bhaji. It weighed 175.48 kg (386 lb 13.8 oz).

Khan previously served as the Senior Vice President and as the Secretary General of the Bangladesh Caterers Association UK.

Khan has participated in the British Curry Festival in Bangladesh and India. He has been nicknamed the "Curry King" by various media outlets.

Khan has written for publications such as The Guardian and Society Today.

== Philanthropy ==
In 2020, when Khan won the Guinness World Record, for the largest onion bhaji, it was used to feed more than 500 people, including 300 homeless people in London and the proceeds from the event were donated to the East London Mosque Trust.

In 2022, he donated dried food to around 2,000 people in his hometown of Rainager in Bangladesh during Ramadan.

== Awards ==
At the Queen's Birthday Honours for 2020, Khan was awarded with MBE honours for his services to the hospitality industry and his charity efforts during the COVID-19 pandemic in the UK and abroad.

== Affiliations ==
Khan is a Fellow of the Royal Society of Arts (FRSA) and is President of the Bangladesh Caterers Association UK.
