= Western Cave Conservancy =

Nonprofit organization in California, US

- Founded: 2003 (23 years ago)
- Type: non-profit
- Headquarters: Santa Cruz, California, United States
- Region served: Western United States
- Method: Conservation by management and acquisitions
- Website: westerncaves.org

The Western Cave Conservancy is a nonprofit 501(c)(3) organization based in central California. It was primarily established to secure permanent protection for threatened caves in the western United States. It also provides management, conservation, and education information to individuals, groups, organizations, and governmental agencies.

== Mission ==
The primary objective and purpose of the Western Cave Conservancy is to protect caves and associated natural and cultural resources within the western United States.

Bylaws of the organization outline the following goals:

- to facilitate public access to the acquired properties, subject to reasonable restrictions, for various scientific, scenic and educational purposes;
- to encourage scientific inquiry and study of the corporation's caves and related surface and subsurface geological, faunal, hydrological, archaeological and other natural and cultural resources;
- to assist cave owners within the corporation's territory with the management and protection of their caves.
- to educate the general public about the origin and importance of caves, and in the value of preserving and protecting caves together with the fragile and irreplaceable resources they contain.

== Scientific contributions ==
Several members of the Western Cave Conservancy received significant publicity in August 2012 following the discovery and analysis of a new family of spiders Trogloraptoridae.

In addition, subsequent projects have included paleoclimate work in both the Sierran Mother Lode, with field work assisted by the Western Cave Conservancy. The paleoclimate work resulted in an article delineating work between 66,000 and 21,000 years ago. The data was collected from several samples obtained with the landowner's permission. This article appeared in Quaternary Research, v.82 (2014). p. 236–248. Another professional paper was published in 2017 about using silicate speleothems as proxies for determining past climates; the site being at Pinnacles National Park in central California (Chemical Geology 449 (2017) 236–252 ).

== Incorporation ==
The Western Cave Conservancy is incorporated in California as a nonprofit public benefit corporation. It was federally recognized as a 501(c)(3) nonprofit organization by the Internal Revenue Service in February, 2003.

In 2007, the Western Cave Conservancy received the additional designation as a nonprofit public charity under section 170(b)(1)(A)(vi) of the Internal Revenue Service.

== See also ==
- Caving
- Speleology
- Cave Conservancies
