= Bhaji =

Deep-fried fritters served as fast food in India, Pakistan and the Caribbean

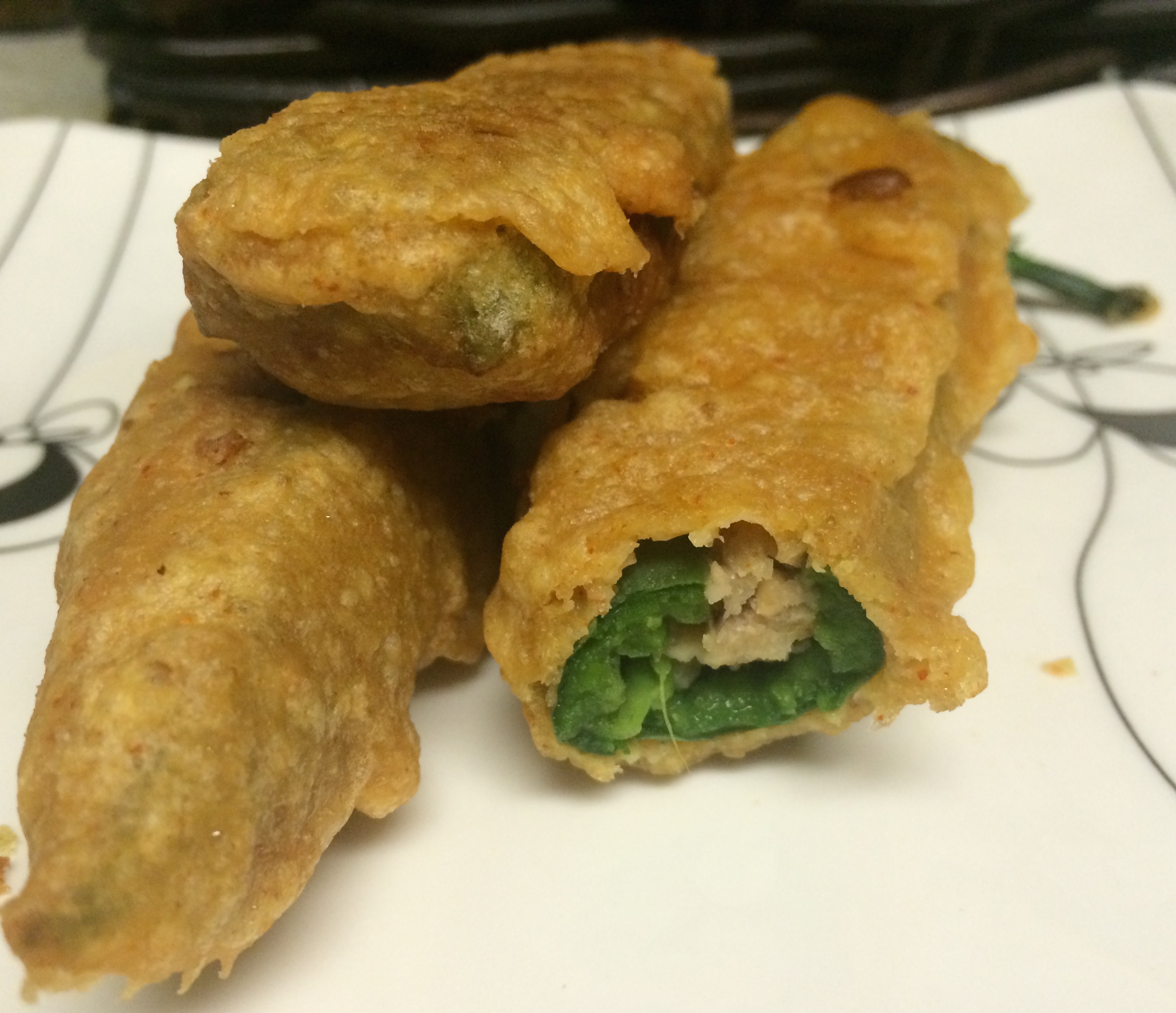
- Stuffed mirchi (chilli) bhaji in an Indian restaurant
- Alternative names: Bhaji, bajji, onion bhaji, bhajia (Gujarati)
- Type: Fritter
- Place of origin: India, Pakistan, Nepal and Bangladesh
- Region or state: Indian subcontinent
- Serving temperature: hot
- Main ingredients: Gram flour, vegetables
- Similar dishes: Pakora and other fritters made from wheat or corn flour

A bhaji (/ˈbɑː.dʒi/, also spelt bajji or bhajee) is a type of fritter originating in the Indian subcontinent. It is made from spicy hot vegetables, commonly onion, and has several variants. It is a popular snack food in India and is also very popular in Pakistan. It can be found for sale in street-side stalls, especially in tapris (on streets) and dhabas (on highways). It is a common starter in Indian restaurant cuisine across the United Kingdom.

== Regional varieties ==
Outside Southern and Western India, such preparations are often known as pakora. Bhajis can be made with chili, potato, onion, plantain, or bread. Regional versions include the potato-based bonda (in South India), vada (originally with potato, in Maharashtra) and gota (in Gujarat), made with green fenugreek leaves.

== Cultural significance ==
Bhajis are a component of traditional Punjabi, Gujarati, Marathi, Tamil, Kannada, Kerala, and Telugu cuisines served on special occasions and at festivals. They are generally served with a cup of coffee, tea, or a traditional serving of yameen. Banana peppers are used for making mirchi bhajji.

Onion bhajis are often eaten as a starter in Indian restaurants in the United Kingdom before the main course, along with poppadoms and other Indian snacks. They may be served with a side of salad and a slice of lemon, or with mango chutney, and are traditionally made to a mild taste. The Guinness World Record for the largest onion bhaji is held by one weighing 175.48 kilograms (386 lb 13 3/4 oz) made by Oli Khan and Team of Surma Takeaway Stevenage on 4 February 2020.

== Gallery ==
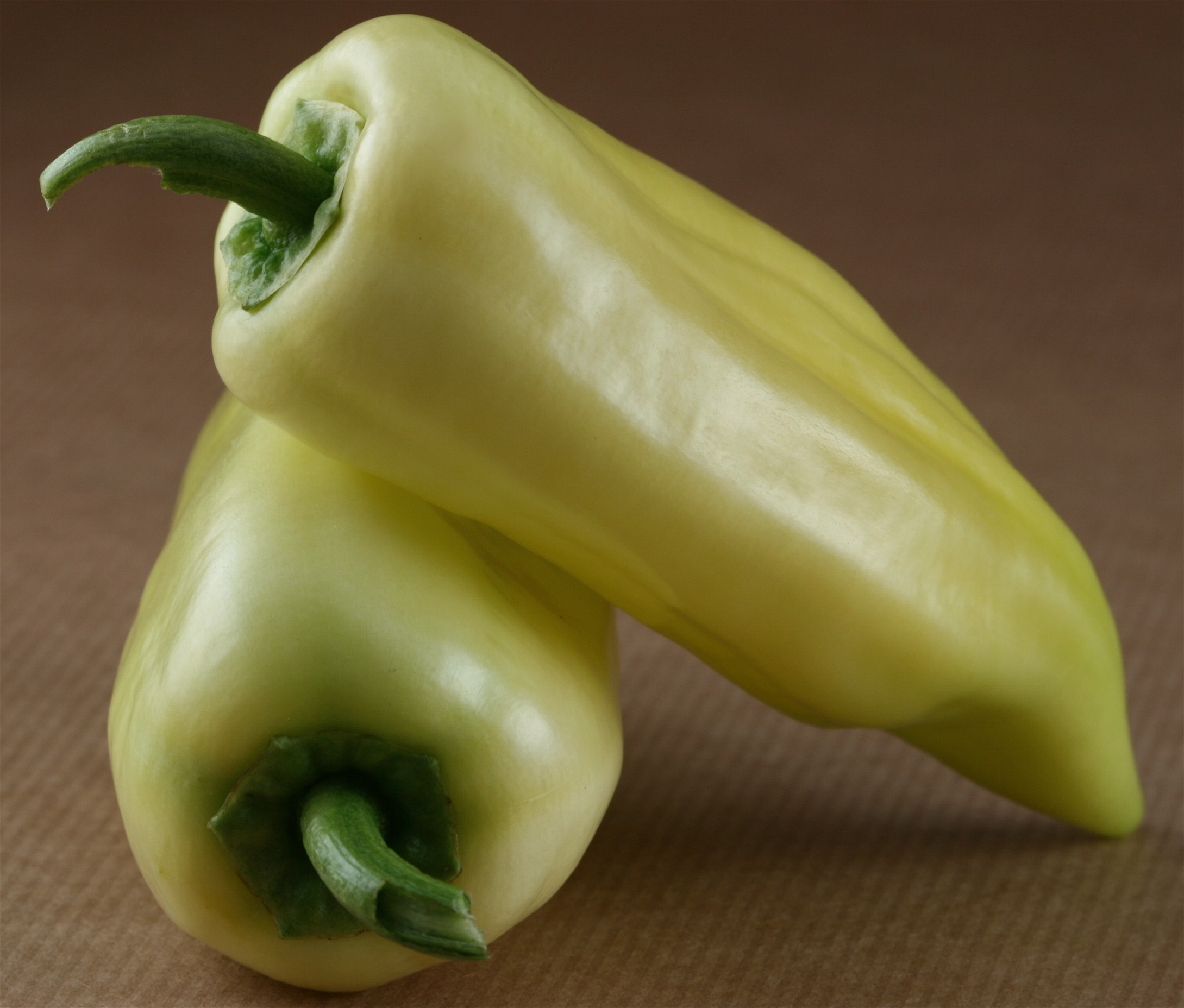
Banana pepper used in mirchi bhaji

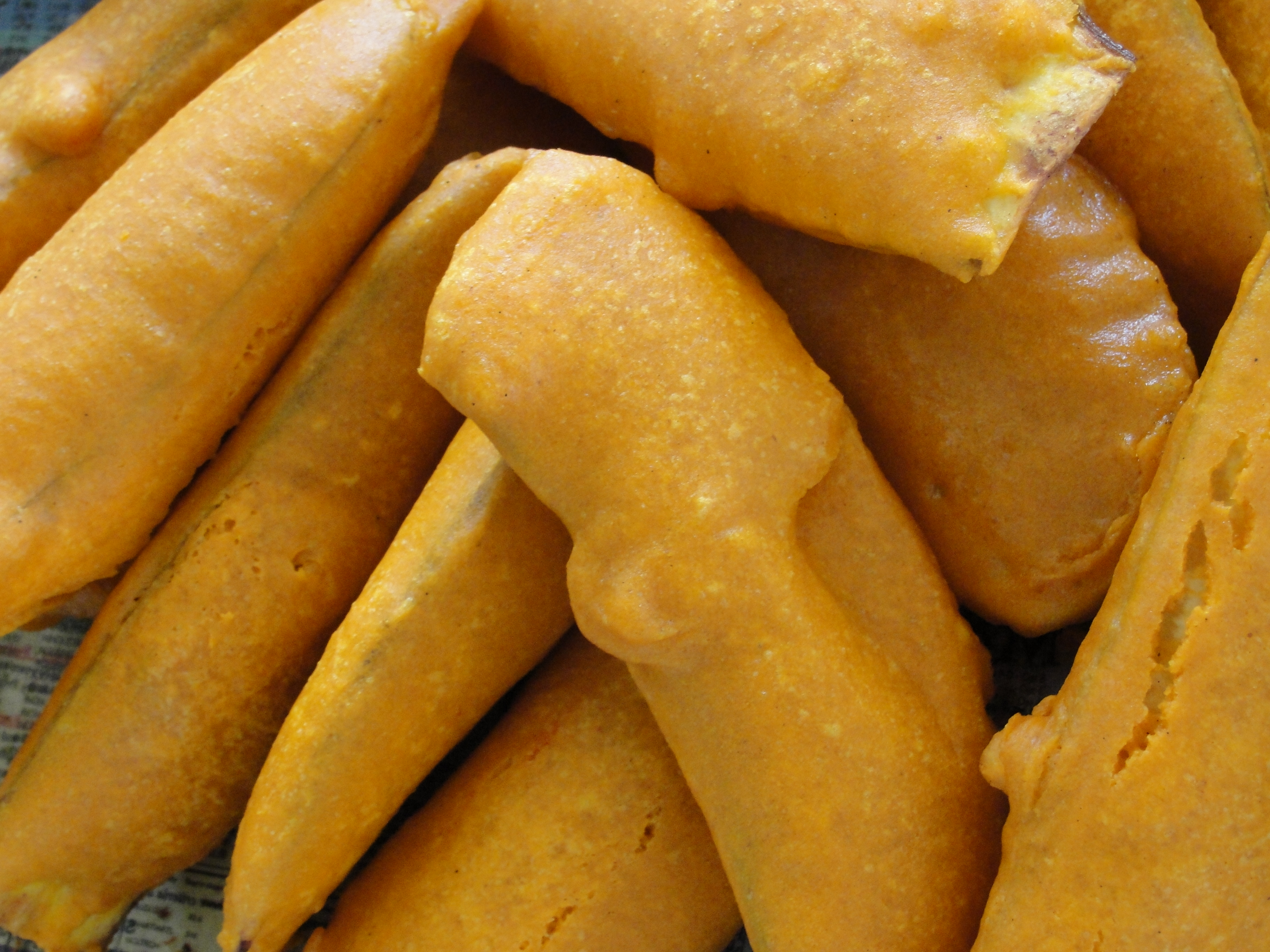
Bhaji

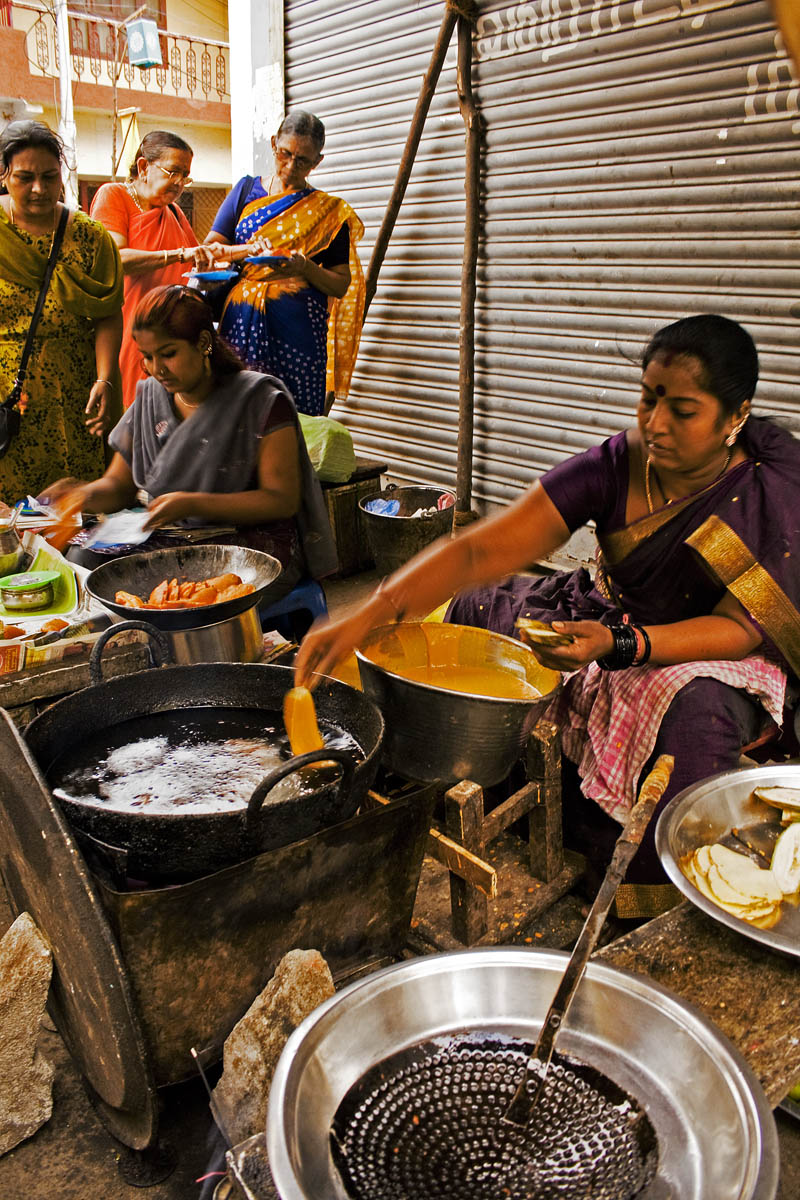
Preparing bhajis in South India

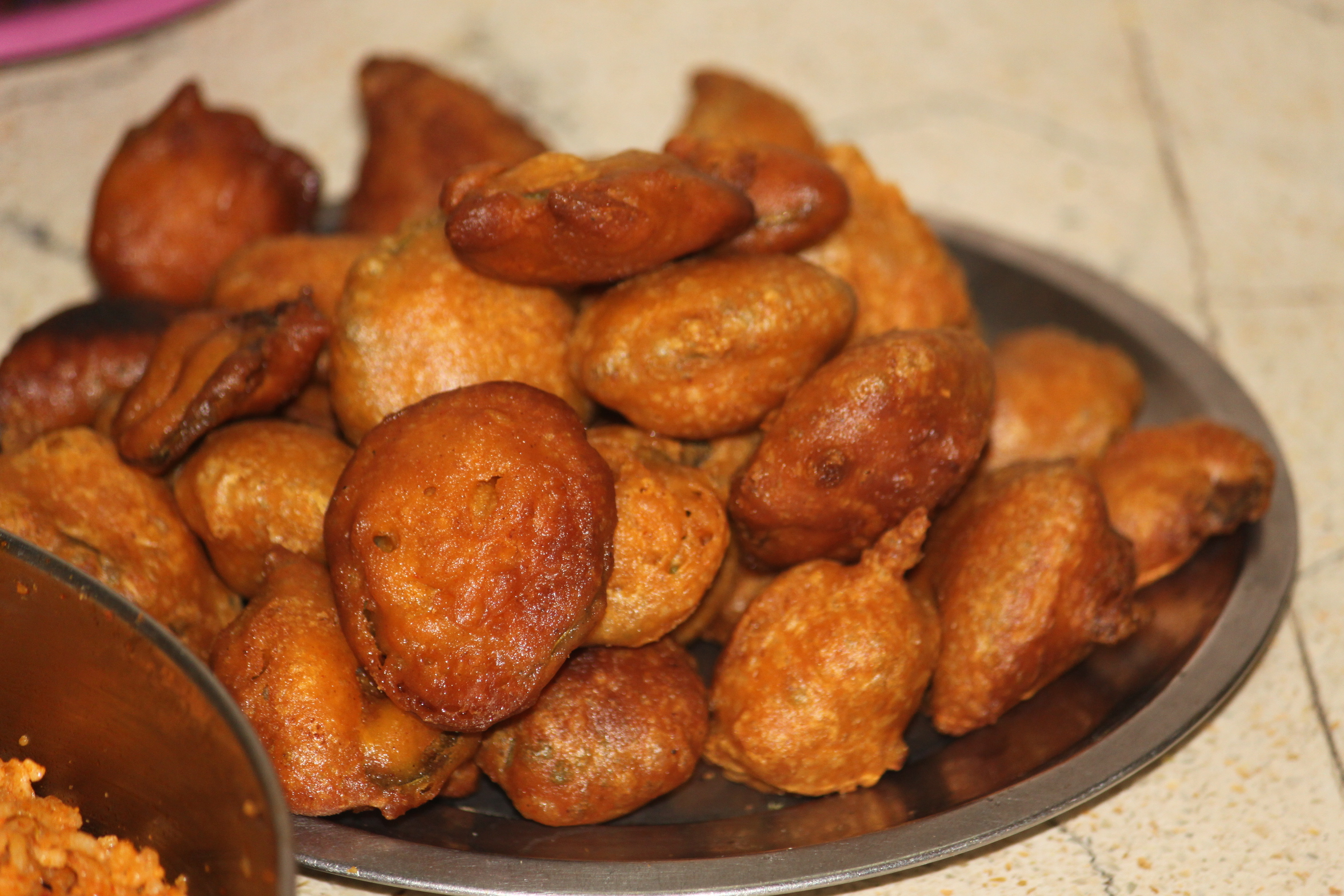
Aloo bhaji

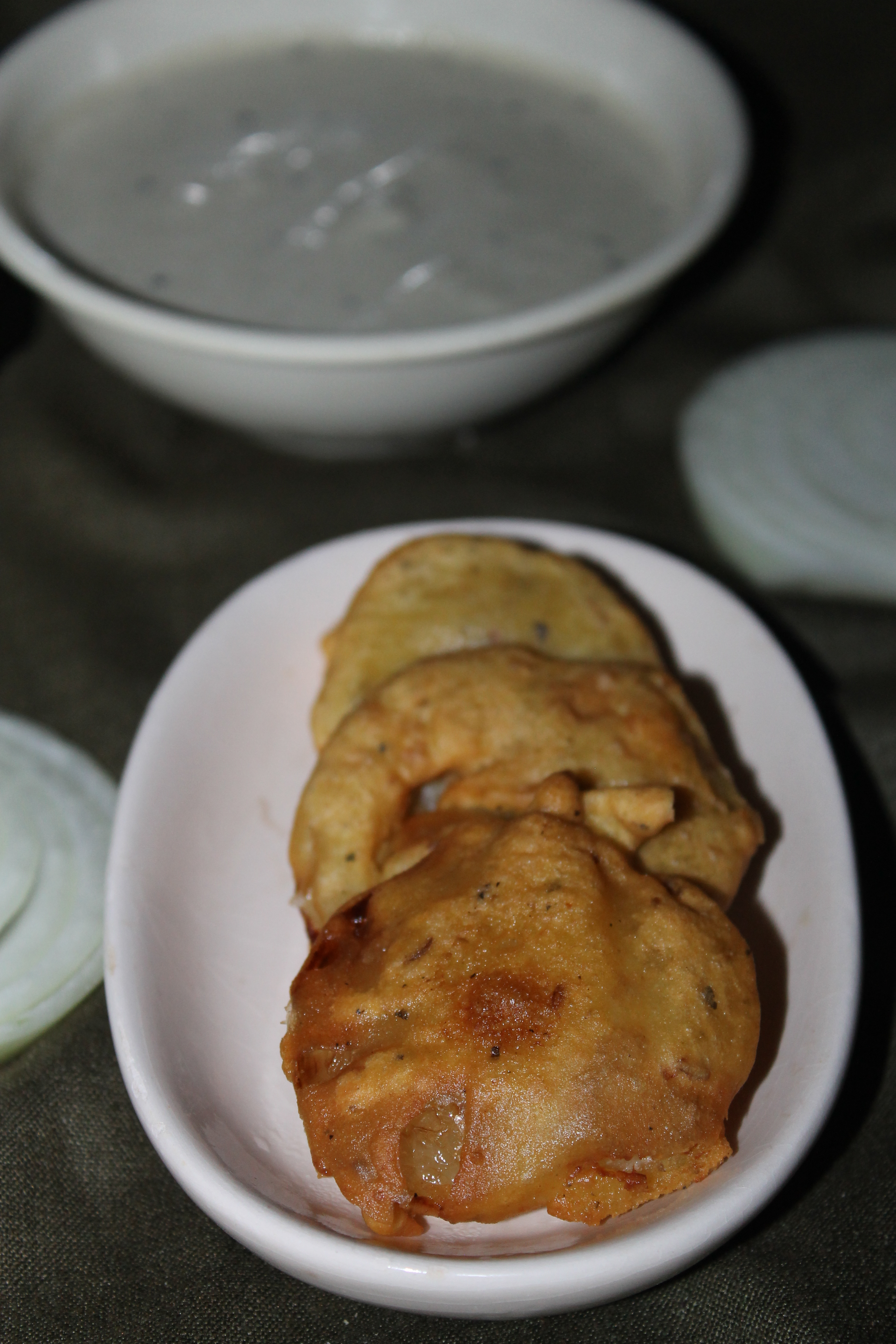
Onion bhaji

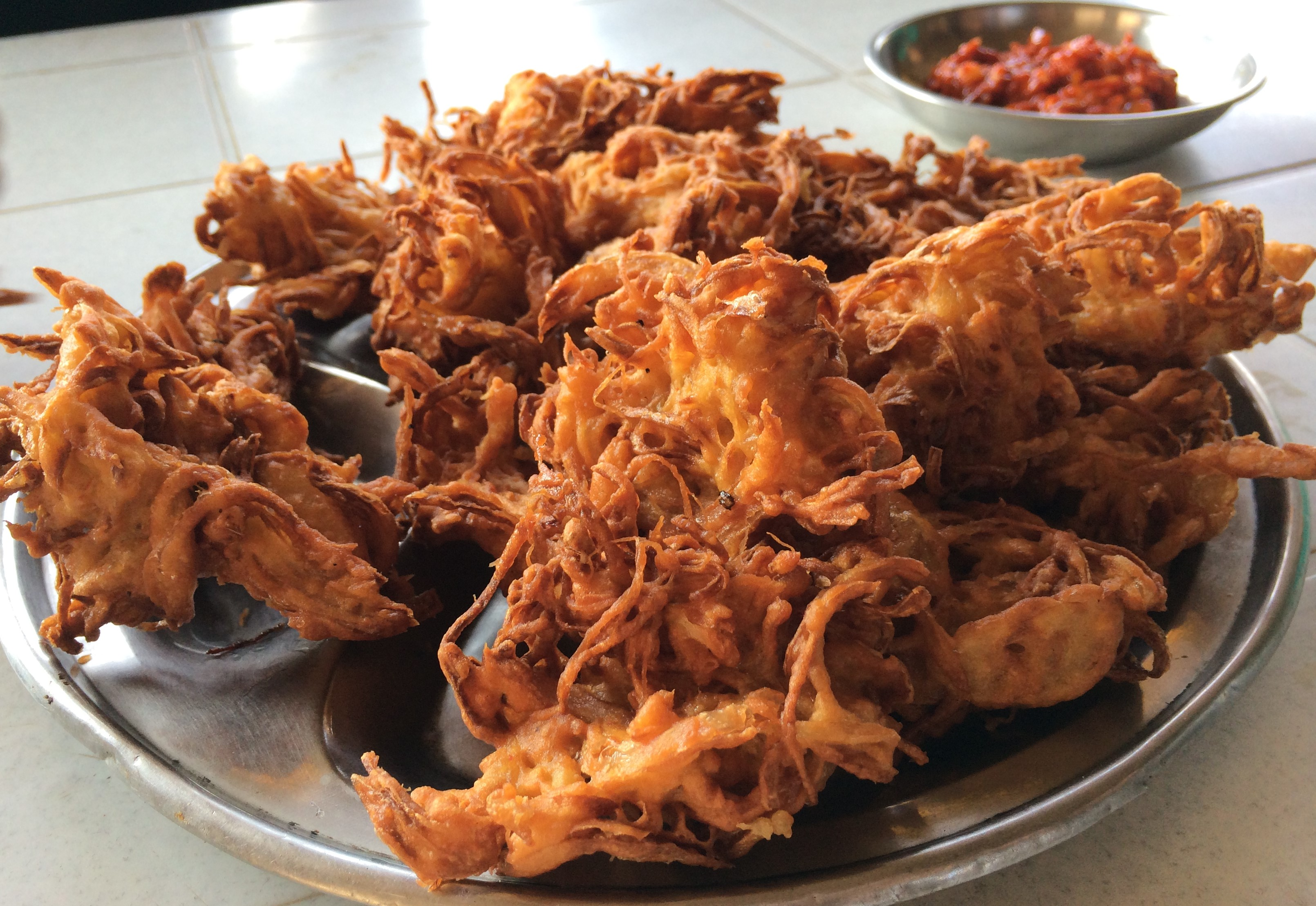
Kanda bhaji
