= World Music Conference =

- Genre: World Music
- Dates: November
- Locations: Midlands, United Kingdom
- Years active: 2007–present
- Founders: Chithra Ramakrishnan
- Organiser: British Carnatic Choir
- Website: www.worldmusicconference.co.uk

The World Music Conference is a prominent annual music conference organised by the British Carnatic Choir in the Midlands UK. It is organized in partnership with the Consul General of India in Birmingham, West Midlands Combined Authority and a host of premier partners.

The three-day event aims to bring together artistes, scholars and music professionals, spanning diverse cultures from across the world to promote a sense of peace and harmony. It specifically focuses on themes such as music and mental health and on children and young people in a bid to inspire and encourage them to consider a career in music.

The first and second conference was held in November 2017 and hosted by the University of Wolverhampton. The free event is believed to be the only one of its kind to be held in the UK. The third conference held in November 2019 was hosted by Aston University.The fourth annual conference is a virtual two day conference, organised by British Carnatic Choir, in partnership with Consulate General of India in Birmingham, West Midlands Combined Authority and hosted by Birmingham City University.The fifth annual World Music Conference is supported by UNESCO-UK.The conference is in partnership with Birmingham City University, Royal Birmingham Conservatoire as Education partners
