= Cave conservancy =

Land trust that primarily manages caves

A cave conservancy is a specialized land trust that primarily manages caves or karst features in the United States. Organizations that serve as cave management consultants to cave owners are usually considered cave conservancies. Almost all cave conservancies are non-profit organizations, but their management methodologies may be diverse. Cave conservancies often provide other services such as being advocates for responsible cave ownership and management, promoting the protection of caves, and advancing research to enhance and discover the values of caves.

== History ==
=== Cave management before 1963 ===
Historically, caves have been managed many different ways, from benign neglect to commercialization or other forms of exploitation with widely varying results. Some people saw commercial potential in caves and the development and profit provided the incentive for ownership and a form of conservation. The 19th century public interest in caves as natural curiosities may have led to the increased public awareness of their intrinsic value. This recognition played a part in some significant caves becoming protected through their inclusion in the US national park system. This became the first public attempt at managing and conserving caves in North America. Prior to 1968, there were no known non-profit cave conservancies. There have been some instances of individuals or families buying caves for access and conservation.

=== Origins ===
The Butler Cave Conservation Society (BCCS) established in 1968 was the first true cave conservancy. The National Speleological Society (NSS), when founded, was not intended to be a cave conservancy; however, it has acquired twelve cave properties, eleven by ownership, which it refers to as nature preserves. While it is probably not a cave conservancy according to the above definition, it is close enough to be considered a cave conservancy by some people. McFails, the first NSS Preserve, was donated to the NSS in 1967. Other land trusts, such as the Nature Conservancy, also own caves. These organizations, as mentioned above, are generally not considered cave conservancies, as the management of caves and other karst features are an incidental part of the purpose of the organization.

=== Conservation in Virginia and the Northeast ===
Many Virginia cavers were among the founders of the National Speleological Society. The same pattern was true as Virginia and northeast area cavers were in the forefront of the founding of the first four cave conservancies. This pattern continued for fifteen years after the founding of BCCS with the addition of three conservancies: the Appalachian Cave Conservancy (ACC), formerly the Perkins Cave Conservation and Management Society (PerCCAMS), 1977; Northeastern Cave Conservancy (NCC), 1978; and Cave Conservancy of the Virginias, 1980. CCV was founded with the intent of being a cave owning conservancy; however, leadership changes in its early history brought people with a different priority. Only recently has CCV come back to its original conservancy mission with the purchase of a significant cave property. The NCC was formed in 1978 to accept the donation of Knox Cave, after the National Speleological Society declined the gift over liability concerns.

=== The spread of conservation ===
The cave conservancy movement spread to other parts of the country in the 1980s with the addition of Pennsylvania Cave Conservancy (PCC), 1983; Michigan Karst Conservancy (MKC), 1983; New Jersey Cave Conservancy (NJCC), 1984; Indiana Karst Conservancy (IKC), 1985; Texas Cave Management Association (TCMA), 1985; Ellis Cave Conservancy (ECC), 1985; and Greater Cincinnati Grotto - Great Saltpetre Preserve (GSP), 1989.

=== The professionalization of Cave Conservancy ===
The Southeastern Cave Conservancy Inc. (SCCI), 1991, established the most effective donation-based fundraising program to support cave acquisition. While the fundraising is done by volunteers, it is difficult to distinguish it from that of the fundraising of a professionally run organization. SCCI was the first conservancy to use re-occurring donations via donor credit cards. This funding method has become more common among conservancies.

The Texas Cave Conservancy (TCC), 1994, became the first to appoint a professional executive director.

=== The move to orthodoxy ===
The concept of having knowledgeable people managing caves has become widely accepted. New cave conservancies are expected to become a regular occurrence. Missouri Caves and Karst Conservancy (MCKC), 1995; Mid-Atlantic Karst Conservancy (MAKC), 1997; West Virginia Cave Conservancy (WVCC), 1997; Carroll Cave Conservancy (CCC), 1998; Karst Conservancy of Illinois (KCI), 1998; Cave Conservancy of Hawaii (CCH), 2002; and the Western Cave Conservancy (WCC), 2002 have been founded in a steady pattern of new cave conservancies.

== Movement growth ==
A unique feature of American society is the extensive amount of volunteerism. Few other conservation societies have a comparable amount of volunteer activity and number and diversity of non-profit organizations in America. It is not surprising that cave conservancies would eventually be formed and that this movement would start in the United States. It appears driven by the twin factors of access and conservation. The environmental philosophy has provided the intellectual rationale to justify the importance of cave conservation and protection by conservancies. Cavers faced with the loss of access to caves due to land development and cave owners attempting to avoid some of the problems associated with visitation are some of the major reasons caves have been closed to cavers. Loss of cave access provides the emotional drive and support needed to motivate and encourage volunteer work and funding. The twin motivating factors of conservation and access drive the cave conservancy movement. Support for the movement also comes from people who envision the cave resource as a tool with which to educate for science and conservation. It is likely that more cave conservancies will be established and that the average number of caves managed by conservancies will increase.

== Accomplishments ==
Cave conservancies now manage more than 115 properties with over 2,700 acres (11 km^{2}) of karst land and more than 230 caves that have a total or more than 200 miles (320 km) of cave passage.

== Leadership ==
Currently, all cave conservancies are board managed. They fall into three types; the most common is an independent and either self-perpetuating or membership elected board. A few of these conservancy boards have a minority of members appointed by other organizations. The second most common type has all of its board members appointed by one or more organizations such as NSS grottos. The three conservancies that have this structure are GSP, PCC, and NJCC. Leaders in all three have reported some problems with this organizational structure. Only TCC has the staff run third type, in which the executive makes the management decisions. Conservancies are mostly volunteer organizations. Two conservancies have employees, TCC and CCV.

== Funding ==
Cash-in-kind volunteerism is the primary source of wealth for most cave conservancies. Often, conservancy members have been the major contributors. Several such as BCCS, SCCI, and IKC have made extensive use of contributions from members. Dues, donations, major gifts, small fund raising events, raffles, and fees for services are the most widely used means of fundraising in addition to extensive volunteer time, which all cave conservancies receive in significant amounts. CCV is unique among cave conservancies in that it uses gaming as an effective fund raising tool. Establishing a gaming infrastructure is usually capital and labor-intensive accompanied with assorted risks. This form of funding is not likely to be used by most conservancies.

== Cave management control types ==
The following is the sequence of cave protection levels used to classify the degree and type of control that conservancies have of a cave. This system suggests a sequence of cave protection strategies to use as appropriate in cave management situations. This method lists the six levels one should consider in order when deciding to protect, manage, and conserve a cave. SICLEO System.

1. Enlightened Self-management by owner
2. Informal management arrangement
3. Contract
4. Lease
5. Conservation Easement
6. Own

Each conservancy has a preferred management level. BCCS, SCCI, MKC, and CCH will usually choose cave ownership as the means to cave management. TCC and ACC are advocates for contract and leasing. NJCC has worked for years to lease the largest cave in New Jersey. CCV has devoted resources for many years to educate cave owners and, by implication, endorses enlightened self-management. IKC employs a varied approach using ownership, leasing, and conservation easement.

== Society naming conventions ==
The first two conservancies were called societies, perhaps influenced by the name of the National Speleological Society. The second, PerCCAMS, and seventh, Texas Cave Management Association (TCMA), conservancies founded have the word "management" in their names. During that time, cave management was beginning to be recognized as a distinct activity and discipline. Even the NSS Conservation Section changed its name to include the word "management" in this era. Starting with the Northeastern Cave Conservancy, almost all cave conservancies have the word "conservancy" in their name, thus "cave conservancy" has been the standard name of the movement. Four conservancies, KCI, IKC, MKC, and MAKC have substituted the word "karst" for "cave", perhaps to emphasize their interest in protecting/preserving the broader landscape. One conservancy, MCKC, uses both words apparently to make a point. One conservancy, PerCCAMS, has recently changed its name to ACC. Great Saltpeter Cave Preserve is the only NSS affiliated conservancy that has the type of name that is usually given to a property instead of an organization. Several other unaffiliated cave conservancies have a variety of names. Generally, cave and karst are interchangeable when naming organizations and not even the most dogmatic stickler for detail would maintain that a cave conservancy would be prevented from managing a karst feature because their name included the word "cave" and not "karst".

== Cave conservancies and the NSS ==
In 1986, Paul Stevens, NSS president at the time, and others foresaw the importance of cave conservancies and the role that the NSS could play in assisting the movement. They recommended to the NSS Board of Governors that they establish the designation of NSS Conservancy. Three conservancies were granted the cave conservancy designation within a year. They were the ECC, the only conservancy to date to disband; IKC; and TCMA. The cave conservancy function was placed in the NSS Department of the Secretary-Treasurer, over time assigned to a couple of different departments and committees. It was clear that the committee had greater potential as a separate unit. As part of the NSS reorganization promoted by NSS officers Fred Wefer, John M. Wilson, and Dave Luckins, the Cave Conservancies Committee (NSS CCC) was established as a separate entity in 1996 in the Cave Management Division of the Department of the Administrative Vice President. Since that time, most cave conservancies have chosen to use the NSS Cave Conservancy designation and /or participate on the conservancies committee. The committee functions as an informal association of cave conservancies, maintains an extensive website, provides a network of knowledgeable people available to assist conservancies in need, and hosts a meeting of cave conservancies at the NSS Convention each year.

As with land trusts in general, the cave conservancy movement in the United States is growing. It usually sets the standards for cave acquisition and management.
