= British Carnatic Choir =

- Choir
- Logo of the British Carnatic Choir
- Founded: 12 June 2015
- Founder: ShruthiUK
- Genre: Carnatic
- Website: www.britishcarnaticchoir.com

The British Carnatic Choir (BCC) is a UK-based Carnatic choir group, the first of its kind in the country.

It was launched in 2015 by ShruthiUK, a South Asian arts organisation based in Solihull with the aim of creating and exploring choral singing in the South Indian classical music genre. According to its website, the ensemble includes children, young adults, music enthusiasts, professionals of both asian and non-asian origin from across the UK. The British Carnatic Choir organises the annual World Music Conference .

== About the Choir ==
The choir is the brainchild of UK-based Chithra Ramakrishnan, herself a Carnatic vocalist and the artistic director of ShruthiUK, a Solihull-based non-profit South Asian arts and culture organisation. Its website lists notable British names like Paul Sabapathy (CVO CBE), Carl Rice (Councillor and ex-Mayor of Birmingham) and Indian ones like Neyveli Santhanagopalan and G. J. R. Krishnan (both Sangeet Natak Akademi Award winning Carnatic vocalists), etc. among its patrons.

== Performances ==
It was officially inaugurated on 12 June 2015 at the Birmingham Chamber of Commerce by Chitravina N Ravikiran, a composer and scholar in Carnatic music. The choir premiered at the Birmingham Conservatoire in November 2015.

In November 2015 the youth ensemble of this choir performed its inaugural concert with around 120 students from the Sparkhill's Greet Primary School at South & City College Birmingham auditorium by presenting a series of Sanskrit songs.

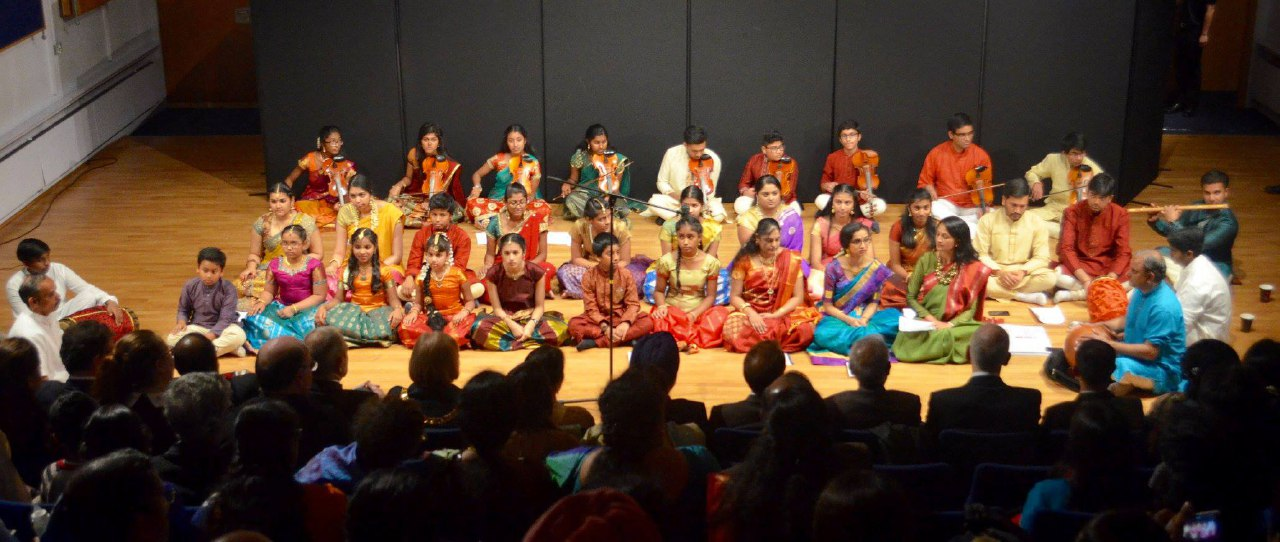
British Carnatic Choir at its premiere concert at the Birmingham Conservatoire in November 2015

== World Music Conference ==
In November 2017 the group organised the World Music Conference. This is an event aimed at bringing together artistes, academics, music educators spanning diverse cultures from across the world to promote a sense of peace and harmony. The event will be free and conducted annually.
