= Nazira (disambiguation) =

Nazira is a town and a municipal board in India. It may also refer to:

- Nazira (name), list of people with the name
- Nazira Assembly constituency, assembly constituency in Assam, India
