= BC2 =

BC2 may refer to:

- Battlefield: Bad Company 2, a 2010 video game
- Bliss bibliographic classification in its current revision
- Second generation backcrossed hybrids
- North American BC-2 airplane
- BC2 (classification), a Paralympic boccia classification

== See also ==
- 2 BC
- BCC (disambiguation)
- BC1
- BC-1 (disambiguation)
- For BC1 hybrids, see Backcrossing
