= Bangladesh Caterers Association UK =

British trade association

- Formation: 1960
- Type: Umbrella organisation
- Headquarters: BCA House, 403 Harrow Road, London, W9 3NF
- Region served: United Kingdom
- Services: Collective representation for British Curry Industry members
- Official language: English, Bengali
- President: Oli Khan MBE
- Secretary General: Mitu Chowdhury
- Chief Treasurer: Tipu Rahman
- Press & Publication Secretary: Naz Islam
- Key people: M A Munim (former president) Oli Khan (former secretary general)
- Website: www.bca1960.com

Bangladesh Caterers Association UK (abbreviated as BCA) is the umbrella organisation of British-Bangladeshi restaurants. It was established in 1960 to represent the catering industry run by the ethnic Bangladeshis.

== Premise ==
In 1960, Israel Miah became the founder president of what became the Bangladesh Caterers Association. It represents the political and economic interests of the owners of 12,000 British Bangladeshi restaurants and takeaways across the UK. It organises various activities to promote Bangladeshi cuisine in Great Britain as well as in Europe.

In 2004, the organisation requested for ethnic restaurant staff positions to be designated as a shortage occupation, which would make it easier for Bangladeshi citizens to obtain UK work permits. In 2014, the organisation established a cross party parliamentary group to lobby the British Government on behalf of the curry industry. It had the support of 24 MPs with 70 more promising to support the cause.

== See also ==
- Business of British Bangladeshis
- Bangladeshi cuisine
