= Breadcoin =

Community food token

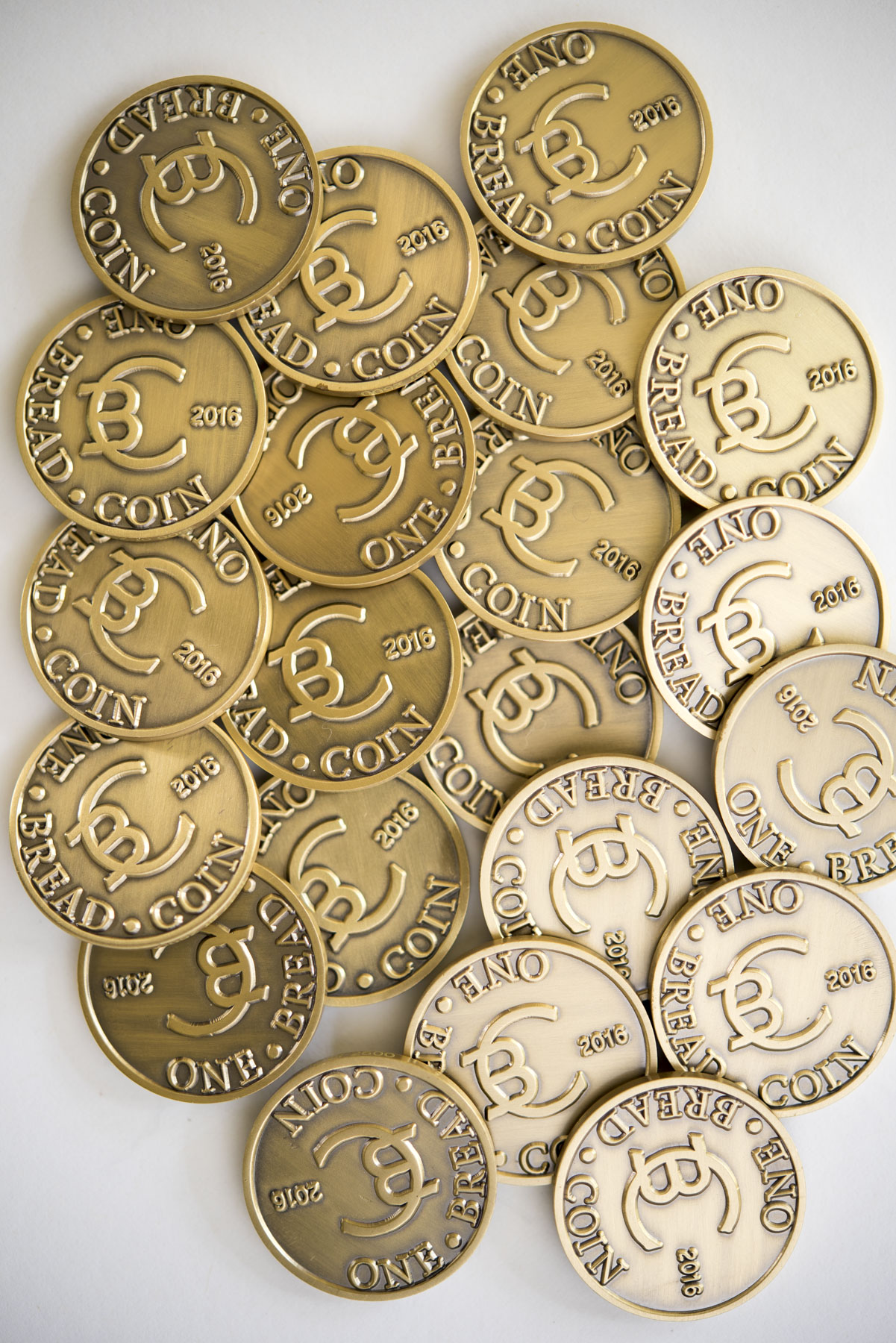
- Breadcoin 2016

Unit
- Symbol: BC

Demographics
- Date of introduction: 2016

Issuance
- Central bank: Breadcoin Foundation
- Website: breadcoin.org

Valuation
- Pegged with: United States dollar
- Value: $3.00
- Pegged by: Breadcoin Foundation

Breadcoin is a community food token created in 2016 to help address the food needs of disadvantaged populations.

The token is issued by the Breadcoin Foundation Ltd, a 501(c)3 nonprofit registered in Washington DC. Over 150 food vendors in Washington DC, Maryland, Pennsylvania, and Florida accept the currency. Local nonprofits distribute breadcoins to those with food-insecurity. Recipients can then use the tokens to purchase food at any of the vendors, increasing their food options and helping them retain their dignity.

Each Breadcoin is valued at $3.00. Breadcoin Foundation sells each coin for $3.00 and pays vendors the full $3.00 when those coins are redeemed—no fees taken out. This is possible because sustaining donors cover the cost of running the organization.

Prior to 2022, Breadcoin Foundation sold the coins for $2.50 each, and paid vendors $2.20 in cash for the tokens, using the $0.30 per token to support the operations of the non-profit.
