= Brazilian Cultural Center =

Brazilian organization

Guimarães Rosa Institute
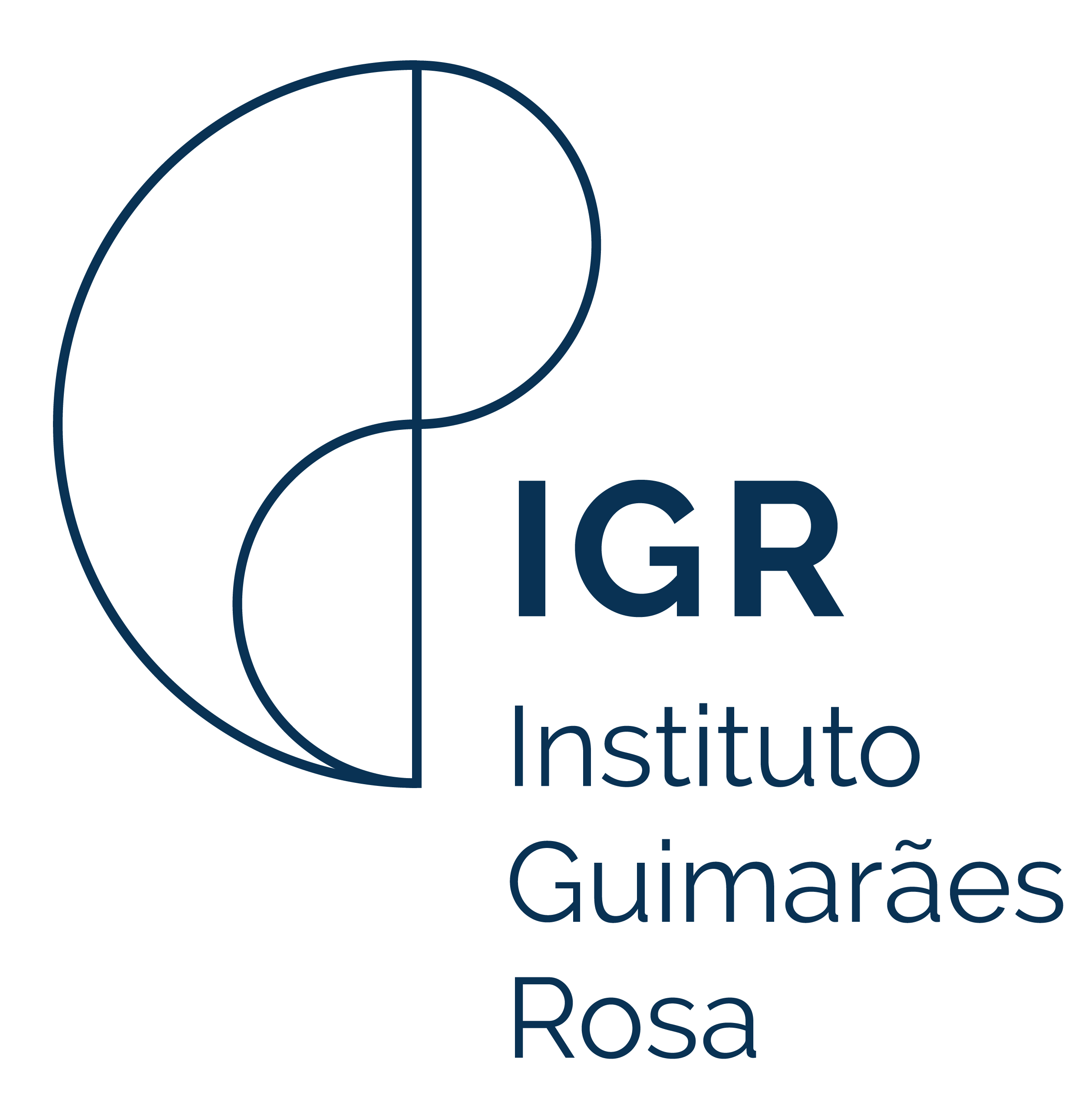
- Formation: 2022
- Founder: Government of Brazil
- Type: Cultural institution
- Purpose: Promotion of Brazilian Language and Culture
- Region served: Worldwide
- Product: Brazilian cultural education
- Website: https://www.gov.br/mre/en/subjects/culture-and-education?set_language=en

The Guimarães Rosa Institute (Portuguese: Instituto Guimarães Rosa, abbreviated IGR) is an institution subordinated to the Brazilian diplomatic missions in each country, being the main instrument for the execution of the Brazilian cultural policy abroad.

Formerly it was known as the Brazilian Cultural Center (Centro Cultural Brasileiro). It was created based on institutions such as the Goethe Institute (Germany) and the Cervantes Institute (Spain).

There are several Instituto Guimarães Rosa currently in Angola, Bolivia, Cape Verde, Chile, Colombia, Costa Rica, Dominican Republic, Ecuador, El Salvador, Finland, Germany, Guinea Bissau, Guyana, Haiti, Italy, Lebanon, Mexico, Mozambique, Nicaragua, Panama, Paraguay, Peru, São Tomé and Príncipe, South Africa, Spain, Suriname, the United States, Uruguay and Venezuela.

The centers are also home to the CELPE-Bras exams.
