= Cheerleading in the United Kingdom =

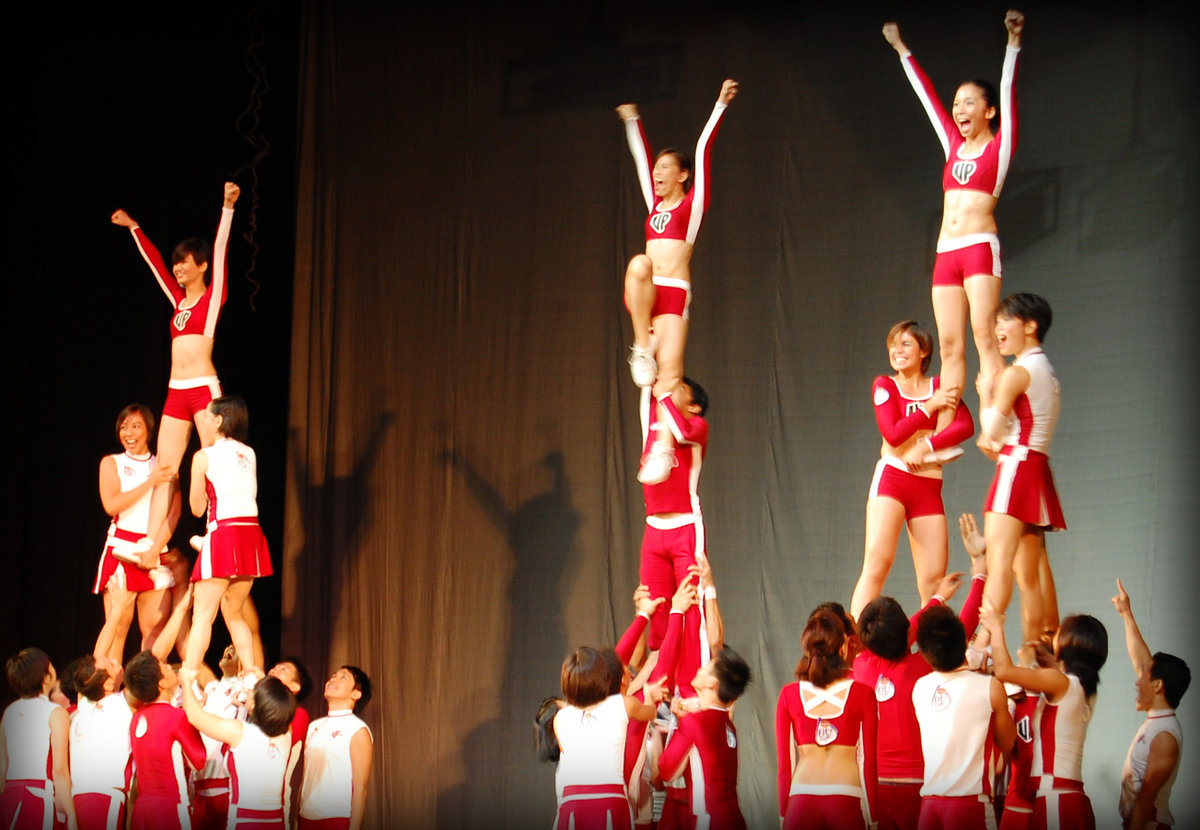
Allstar Cheerleaders at cheerleading competition

Cheerleading is a sport that is practised all throughout the world, with increasing popularity within the United Kingdom. Cheerleading has over 89,000 athletes within the United Kingdom, with just over 900 teams in England alone, with the newfound success and passion of UK based teams on the international stage helping to change perceptions within the region. Teams from the United Kingdom have gained international recognition, with the Olympic Channel producing a 10-minute short documentary following Unity Allstars' team Ruby to highlight the increase momentum of competitive cheerleading within the United Kingdom.

Cheerleading is conducted through all-star clubs as well as university and school teams.

As a sport, cheerleading is offered as a PE extracurricular in a number of UK based schools, with it being estimated that 37% of schools now offer a cheerleading program as an extracurricular physical education choice, leading to UK participation within World Schools Cheerleading Championships and National Scholastic Cheerleading championships being offered.

A number of universities also offer cheerleading as an option within the United Kingdom, with 70 universities offering it as an extracurricular option in 2018, with a further 23 offering competitive cheerleading. Cheerleading is a recognised sport under the International University Sports Federation, however, the sport remains unrecognised by the British Universities and Colleges Sport association.

The main way that cheerleading as a sport is provided in the UK is through all-star competitive clubs, with clubs located throughout England, Northern Ireland, Scotland and Wales.

== Governing bodies ==
SportCheer UK (SCUK) acts as the governing body for cheerleading within the United Kingdom, being recognised as such by the International Cheer Union, the international governing body for cheerleading. SCUK is composed of governing body members from England (SportCheer England), Northern Ireland (SportCheer Northern Ireland), Isle of Mann (Sport Cheer Isle of Mann), Scotland (SportCheer Scotland) and Wales (SportCheer Wales). SCUK provides an age grid and safety rules for both cheer and performance cheer/dance (aligned with IASF), helping to align the sport under a single standard across the United Kingdom.

As part of their governing body role, the governing body members help organise representative teams from their respective countries to compete at the ICU World Championships, held in Florida. In 2023, SCUK was represented by national teams from England, Scotland and Wales, winning a total of 7 medals.

On a more broad scale, SportCheer England and SportCheer Scotland are both members of the umbrella organisation of the European Cheer Union, a recognised regional branch of the International Cheer Union.

== Competition divisions ==
Within the United Kingdom, SportCheer UK and its members model their structure off divisions and age groupings after the IASF guidelines.

As in the United States, competitions are grouped into divisions that are based on a combination of the team's age category, difficulty level and size. Certain categories are also further separated into "all-girl" (females only) and "co-ed" (mixture of genders) groups. For large events with high numbers of teams registered in one division, organisations also can then further split the divisions based on the team's size or the gym/studio's size to form a manageable number of teams within a division. For example, a team may compete in divisions such as "extra small youth level 1", or "senior co-ed level 5".

The age category of the team also restricts the level that the team may be entered into for safety reasons, with younger age category teams not being allowed to enter higher levels for safety. There are also "sub-categories" within the junior and senior age divisions that do not allow teams with younger age category eligible athletes to enter the higher levels.

All-star age groups are based on the competitors' ages at 31 August 2023, with that age being applicable for the entire season. The exception to this rule is the IASF international divisions, where the eligible age of an athlete is determined by their age during 2024 i.e. is a 12 year old athlete is participating in an IASF division with a minimum age of 14, they are legal if they turn 14 during 2024, or an athlete who turns 13 on 2 January 2024 is eligible for a division where the maximum age is 12 as they would be 12 for at least 1 day during 2024.

Event producers have the option of offering all of the divisions, or only a selection, with speciality divisions varying from EP to EP.

Currently overlap in the age categories enables an athlete to compete in multiple teams who are entered in different age categories. For example, an 11 year old could compete on teams that are entered in the youth, junior and senior age categories.

Newly introduced in 2023-2024 for senior divisions with a minimum age of 16 years or below was a rule stating the age spread of team members may not exceed 10 years. For example, a senior level 1 team where the youngest athlete was 13 is no longer allowed any athletes on the team who are aged of 23 years old. This however only allowed to SCUK divisions and does not include the IASF divisions.

Cheer Age Grid
Division	Ages	Gender	Number on Team	Level Restriction
Tiny Novice	3 - 6	Female/Male	5 - 30	1
Tiny Prep	3 - 6	Female/Male	5 - 30	1
Tiny	3 - 6	Female/Male	5 - 32	1
Mini Novice	5 - 8	Female/Male	5 - 30	1
Mini Prep	5 - 8	Female/Male	5 - 30	1, 2.1
Mini	5 - 8	Female/Male	5 - 32	1, 2
Youth Novice	6 - 12	Female/Male	5 - 30	1
Youth Prep	7 - 11	Female/Male	5 - 30	1, 2.1
Youth	7 - 11	Female/Male	5 - 32	1, 2, 3
Youth	8 - 11	Female/Male	5 - 32	4
Youth	9 - 11	Female/Male	5 - 32	5
Junior Prep	8 - 14	Female/Male	5 - 30	1, 2.1
Junior	8 - 14	Female/Male	5 - 32	1, 2, 3, 4
Junior	9 - 14	Female/Male	5 - 38	5, 6
Senior Prep	11 + min. 1 athlete being 15 years or older	Female/Male	5 - 30	1, 2.1
Senior	11 + min. 1 athlete being 15 years or older	Female/Male	5 - 32	1, 2, 4.2
Senior	11 + min. 1 athlete being 15 years or older	Female/Male	5 - 38	5
Senior	11 + min. 1 athlete being 15 years or older	No males	5 - 32	3, 4
Senior Coed	11 + min. 1 athlete being 15 years or older	1+ males	5 - 32	3, 4
Open	17+	Female/Male	5 - 32	1, 2
Open	17+	No Males	5 - 32	3, 4
Open Coed	17+	1+ males	5 - 32	3, 4
IASF U12	7 - 12 (2011 - 2016)	Female/Male	5 - 30	1, 2, 3, 4
IASF U12	7 - 12 (2011 - 2016)	1+ males	5 - 30	5
IASF U16	12 - 16 (2007 - 2012)	Female/Male	10 - 24	1, 2, 3
IASF U16	12 - 16 (2007 - 2012)	No males	10 - 24	4
IASF U16 Coed	12 - 16 (2007 - 2012)	1+ males	10 - 24	4
IASF U18	14 - 18 (2005 - 2010)	Female/Male	10 - 24	1, 2
IASF U18	14 - 18 (2005 - 2010)	No males	10 - 24	3, 4, 5, 6
IASF U18 Coed	14 - 18 (2005 - 2010)	1+ males	10 - 24	3, 4, 5,
IASF Open	16+ (Born in 2008 or earlier)	No males	10 - 24	3, 4, 5, 6
IASF Open	17+ (Born in 2007 or earlier)	No males	10 - 24	7
IASF Open Coed	16+ (Born in 2008 or earlier)	1+ males	10 - 24	3, 4
IASF Open Coed	16+ (Born in 2008 or earlier)	1 - 4 males	10 - 24	5, 6
IASF Open Coed	17+ (Born in 2007 or earlier)	1 - 4 males	10 - 24	7
IASF Open Coed	16+ (Born in 2008 or earlier)	5 - 16 males	10 - 24	5, 6
IASF Open Coed	17+ (Born in 2007 or earlier)	5 - 16 males	10 - 24	7
IASF Open Non-Tumbling	16+ (Born in 2008 or earlier)	Female/Male	10 - 30	3NT, 4NT
IASF Open Non-Tumbling	16+ (Born in 2008 or earlier)	No Males	10 - 30	5NT, 6NT
IASF Open Non-Tumbling	17+ (Born in 2007 or earlier)	No Males	10 - 30	7NT
IASF Open Non-Tumbling Coed	16+ (Born in 2008 or earlier)	1 - 20 males	10 - 30	5 NT, 6NT
IASF Open Non-Tumbling Coed	17+ (Born in 2007 or earlier)	1 - 20 males	10 - 30	7NT
IASF Global Club	16+ (Born in 2008 or earlier)	No Males	10 - 24	6
IASF Global Club Coed	16+ (Born in 2008 or earlier)	1 - 16	10 - 24	6
Masters	At least 75% of athletes aged 25+ Minimum age of 17	Female/Male	5 - 38	1, 2
Cheer Abilities Youth	8 - 12	Female/Male	Unlimited	2
Cheer Abilities Junior	12 - 16	Female/Male	Unlimited	2
Cheer Abilities Senior	12+ Min. 1 athlete 17+	Female/Male	Unlimited	2
Adaptive Abilities Youth	8 - 12	Female/Male	5 - 30	1, 2, 3 (Beginner, Novice, Median)
Adaptive Abilities Junior	12 - 16	Female/Male	5 - 30	1, 2, 3, 4 (Beginner, Novice, Median, Advanced)
Adaptive Abilities Senior All Girl	12+ Min 1 athlete 17+	No Males	5 - 30	1, 2, 3, 4 (Beginner, Novice, Median, Advanced)
Adaptive Abilities Senior Coed	12+ Min 1 athlete 17+	1+ Males	5 - 30	1, 2, 3, 4 (Beginner, Novice, Median, Advanced)
University All Girl	17+ 90% registered uni student 10% allowed past students alumni if graduated within last 4 years	No Males	5 - 38	1, 2, 3, 4, 5, 6, 7
University Coed	17+ 90% registered uni student 10% allowed past students alumni if graduated within last 4 years	1+ Males	5 - 38	
University Non-Tumbling	17+ 90% registered uni student 10% allowed past students alumni if graduated within last 4 years	Female/Male	5 - 38	2NT, 3NT, 4NT, 5NT, 6NT, 7NT

SCUK also provides guidelines for combining or splitting these divisions in the best interest of providing a competitive environment, requiring that where possible, there should be at least 3 teams in any given division and level. Under these guidelines, teams of different levels are not allowed to be combined into one division, and teams of different ages may not be combined into one division.

Novice cheer divisions are prohibited to be combined or further split. Likewise, All Star Prep divisions are prohibited from being combined, however, prep divisions may be split by size per the All Star Elite split guidelines.

Within All Star Elite Cheer, the following division combinations are permitted in the event of there only being a single team registered in either division, with event producers then being required to follow the mandatory split guidelines and no other combinations of all start elite divisions being permitted:

- Senior Coed Level 3 and Senior Level 3
- Senior Coed Level 4 and Senior Level 4
- Open Coed Level 3 and Open Level 3
- Open Coed Level 4 and Open Level 4
- Open and corresponding University divisions (e.g. University Level 1 and Open level 1)

When splitting divisions, divisions may be split by size, coed/all girlor by additional optional splits. These must be made in a specific order, depending on the division. If the first mandatory split option cannot be made without leaving a single team in a division, but the second can be made without doing so, the event producer may make the second split first at their discretion.

When splitting a team by size, they following team size designations apply:

- Levels 1 - 4, 4.2, All Star Prep:
  - X-Small - 5 - 14 athletes
  - Small - 15 - 22 athletes
  - Medium - 23 - 32 athletes
- Youth Level 5, Junior Levels 5 - 6:
  - X-Small - 5 - 14 athletes
  - Small - 5 - 22 athletes
  - Medium - 23 - 32 athletes
  - Large - 33 - 38 athletes

All star dance falls under the governance of cheerleading as a cheerleading discipline per the International Cheer Union. As such, SCUK also outlines the rules and divisions for this discipline.

Within all SCUK divisions, the styles of pom, jazz, hip hop, lyrical/contemporary and traditional pom/cheer dance are offered. Prop and high kick may also be offered by individual event producers, with high kick being allowed to be offered at any age group as a speciality item.

Performance Cheer/Dance Age Grid
Division	Ages	Gender	Number on Team	Team Size Split (where applicable)
Tiny	6 and under	Female/Male	4 or more	Small - 4 - 14 dancers Large - 15+ dancers
Mini	9 and under	Female/Male	4 or more	Small - 4 - 14 dancers Large - 15+ dancers
Youth	12 and under	Female/Male	4 or more	Small - 4 - 14 dancers Large - 15+ dancers
Junior	15 and under	No Males	4 or more	Small - 4 - 14 dancers Large - 15+ dancers
Junior Coed	15 and under	1+ Males	4 or more	Small - 4 - 14 dancers Large - 15+ dancers
Senior	11+ Minimum one dancer 16+	No Males	4 or more	Small - 4 - 14 dancers Large - 15+ dancers
Senior Coed	11+ Minimum one dancer 16+	1+ Males	4 or more	Small - 4 - 14 dancers Large - 15+ dancers
International U16	12 – 16 years old	Female/Male	6 - 30 dancers	Elite - 6 - 15 dancers Premier - 16 - 30 dancers
International Open	16 years and older (Born 2008 or earlier)	No Males	6 - 30 dancers	Elite - 6 - 15 dancers Premier - 16 - 30 dancers
International Open Coed	16 years and older (Born 2008 or earlier)	1+ Males	6 - 30 dancers	Elite - 6 - 15 dancers Premier - 16 - 30 dancers
International Open All Male	16 years and older (Born 2008 or earlier)	No Females	6 - 30 dancers	Elite - 6 - 15 dancers Premier - 16 - 30 dancers
University	17+ 90% registered uni student 10% allowed past students alumni if graduated within last 4 years	No Males	4 or more	Small - 4 - 14 dancers Large - 15+ dancers
University Coed	17+ 90% registered uni student 10% allowed past students alumni if graduated within last 4 years	1+ Males	4 or more	Small - 4 - 14 dancers Large - 15+ dancers
Masters Dance	Minimum age 17 At least 75% of dancers required to be aged 25+	Female/Male	4 or more	Small - 4 - 14 dancers Large - 15+ dancers
Dance Abilities Youth	8 - 12	Female/Male	Unlimited	Small - 4 - 14 dancers Large - 15+ dancers
Dance Abilities Junior	12 - 16	Female/Male	Unlimited	Small - 4 - 14 dancers Large - 15+ dancers
Dance Abilities Senior	12+ Minimum of 1 athlete 17+	Female/Male	Unlimited	Small - 4 - 14 dancers Large - 15+ dancers
Adaptive Abilities Hip Hop Youth	8 - 12	Female/Male	4 or more	Small - 4 - 14 dancers Large - 15+ dancers
Adaptive Abilities Hip Hop Junior	12 - 16	Female/Male	4 or more	Small - 4 - 14 dancers Large - 15+ dancers
Adaptive Abilities Hip Hop Senior	12+ Minimum of 1 athlete aged 17+	Female/Male	4 or more	Small - 4 - 14 dancers Large - 15+ dancers

Likewise with the cheer divisions, the dance divisions can also be split, being split first by team size and then by gender. If there is only one team registered in any junior or senior division within the same category, the event producer must combine the all girl and coed divisions as long as a program is not forced to compete against another team from the same studio e.g. junior with junior coed.

=== Crossover Rules ===
Athletes are not allowed to cross over into more than 2 cheer teams and no more than 6 routines in total (inclusive of cheer, performance cheer/dance, stunt groups and solos) at any one event. However, SCUK allows individual EPs to place further restrictions upon this.

Athletes are also not allowed to crossover between different size teams in the cheer divisions within the same age and level, regardless of the split guidelines - i.e. an athlete may not compete on a small all star elite cheer youth 1 team and a large all star elite cheer youth 1 team. However, this does not apply to performance cheer/dance, with an athlete allowed to compete on both small junior pom and large junior pom teams for example.

Crossovers are not allowed between novice to prep, novice to all star or novice to international divisions, with an exception being an athlete crossing over between a novice/prep division and a stunt group division.

At Worlds bid events, an athlete is not allowed to crossover to any other team, competing on only one team only in that round.

=== Routine Time Limits ===
Different styles/divisions have different time limits for the routines entered within them. These are as follows:

Routine Time Limits
Routine Type	Time Limits
All Star Cheer University Cheer School Cheer Masters Cheer IASF Tiny, Mini, Youth, Junior, Senior & Open	Maximum of 2 minutes 30s
IASF Global	30s min to 40s max - Opening cheer 20s max - Move from cheer portion to set up for music portion 2 minutes and 30s maximum - Music portion
IASF Non-Tumbling University Non-Tumbling	Maximum of 2 minutes
Prep Cheer	Maximum of 2 minutes
Novice Cheer	Maximum of 1 minute 30s
Dance/Performance Cheer	Minimum 1 minute 45s Maximum 2 minutes 15s
Stunt Group Partner Stunt Individual/Solo	1 minute 15s

== Competitions ==
Teams from across the United Kingdom take part in a range of various local and national level competitions throughout the year. Some competition providers offer the chance for teams to win a "bid" in order to qualify to attend international competitions, such as the IASF Cheerleading Worlds or Summit, held in Orlando, Florida annually.The first UK competition to offer these bids to the IASF Worlds was Future Cheer in 2005 and still does every year.

Competition providers within the United Kingdom include:

- BCA Cheer and Dance (British Cheerleading Association)
- Cheer City (Formally known as Leicester Cheer Competitions)
- CheerSport Wales
- Energy Events
- Future Cheer
- International Cheer Coalition (ICC)
- Incredibly Cool Events (ICE)
- Jamfest Europe/Varsity Europe
- Legacy Cheer and Dance
- PowerUp Events
- Revolution Cheer
- Soar Cheer and Dance
- UK Cheerleading Association (UKCA)

An estimated 60 competitions per years are run by event producers, with national competitions being held at large arenas such as the O2 and NEC.

=== International Competitions ===
Teams from the United Kingdom compete at a number of international competitions annually, with the main ones being the ICU World Championships, the IASF Cheerleading World Championships and Allstar World Championships. However teams also travel to compete in other competitions internationally, such as the NCA All-Star National Championships in Dallas, Texas, and The Summit in Orlando, Florida. Recently there has been the addition of The European Summit and the AIA Global Tournament.

==== ICU World Championships ====
The International Cheer Union hosts the ICU Junior World and World Cheerleading Championships annually, with the competition being recognised as the official world championships for the sport. The national governing bodies that make up SCUK field national teams to compete at this championship, with the teams historically achieving successful results.

In 2016, the ICU announced it would be adding a new division for physically disabled athletes after collaboration with Disabled British athlete Rick Rodgers and his charity, ParaCheer International. As part of this launch, ParaCheer International sent the world's first Adaptive Abilities team to perform a showcase at the ICU Worlds 2016 to launch the division under the name Team England. Team England went on to win the first gold medal in ParaCheer in 2017, being England's first ever world champion cheerleading team at an ICU competition. This led to the ICU then building a collaboration with Special Olympics in 2017 and adding divisions for athletes with intellectual impairment too.

In 2023, the United Kingdom was represented by national teams from England, Scotland and Wales at the ICU World Championships, winning a total of 7 medals.

2023 ICU World Championship Results - United Kingdom Teams (England, Scotland, Wales)
	Country	Team/Division	Place	Ref.
1st place, gold medalist(s)	Scotland	Adaptive Abilities Unified Pom	1st	
1st place, gold medalist(s)	England	Youth Coed Median	1st	
2nd place, silver medalist(s)	England	Adaptive Abilities Unified Median	2nd	
3rd place, bronze medalist(s)	England	Junior Coed Elite	3rd	
3rd place, bronze medalist(s)	Wales	Adaptive Abilities Unified Advanced Coed	3rd	
3rd place, bronze medalist(s)	England	Team Cheer Hip Hop	3rd	
3rd place, bronze medalist(s)	England	Junior Hip Hop (Performance Cheer)	3rd	
	England	Adaptive Abilities Unified Advanced Coed	4th	
	Scotland	Team Cheer Jazz	4th	
	Scotland	Junior Pom (Performance Cheer)	4th	
	Scotland	Youth Hip Hop (Performance Cheer)	4th	
	England	Youth Pom	4th	
	Scotland	Youth Pom	5th	
	Wales	Youth Pom	6th	
	England	Coed Premier	7th	
	Wales	All Girl Elite	8th	
	Wales	Team Cheer Pom	8th	
	Scotland	All Girl Elite	9th	
	Scotland	Team Cheer Pom	9th	
	Scotland	Junior Hip Hop (Performance Cheer)	9th	
	Scotland	Team Cheer Hip Hop	9th	
	Scotland	Youth All Girl Median	10th	
	England	All Girl Premier	10th	
	Scotland	Doubles Hip Hop (Performance Cheer)	TIE 11th	
	England	Team Cheer Jazz	11th	
	Scotland	Doubles Pom (Performance Cheer)	13th	
	Wales	Doubles Pom (Performance Cheer)	17th	
	England	Team Cheer Pom	17th	

Note: If a team did not advance from semi-finals to finals, results from semi-finals are listed.

2024 ICU World Championship Results - United Kingdom Teams (England, Scotland, Wales)
	Country	Team/Division	Place
1st place, gold medalist(s)	England	Youth All Girl Advanced	1st
1st place, gold medalist(s)	Wales	Adaptive Abilities Unified Median	1st
1st place, gold medalist(s)	England	Adaptive Abilities Unified Advance Coed	1st
1st place, gold medalist(s)	England	Special Abilities Unified Freestyle Pom	1st
2nd place, silver medalist(s)	England	Youth Coed Advanced	2nd
2nd place, silver medalist(s)	England	Adaptive Abilities Unified Median	2nd
2nd place, silver medalist(s)	England	Team Cheer Hip Hop (Performance Cheer)	2nd
3rd place, bronze medalist(s)	England	Junior All Girl Elite	3rd
	Scotland	Adaptive Abilities Unified Median	4th
	Scotland	Youth Hip Hop (Performance Cheer)	4th
	Scotland	Youth All Girl Median	5th
	Scotland	Youth Pom (Performance Cheer)	5th
	Scotland	Team Cheer Pom (Performance Cheer)	5th
	England	Team Cheer Jazz (Performance Cheer)	6th
	Scotland	Junior Pom (Performance Cheer)	8th
	Scotland	Team Cheer Jazz (Performance Cheer)	8th
	Wales	Coed Elite	10th
	Wales	Team Cheer Jazz (Performance Cheer)	10th

Note: If a team did not advance from semi-finals to finals, results from semi-finals are listed.

2025 ICU World Championship Results - United Kingdom Teams (England, Scotland, Wales)
	Country	Team/Division	Place	Ref.
1st place, gold medalist(s)	Scotland	Adaptive Abilities Unified - Median 3	1st	
1st place, gold medalist(s)	England	Adaptive Abilities Unified - Advance 4 Coed	1st	
1st place, gold medalist(s)	England	Special Abilities Unified Pom (Performance Cheer)	1st	
1st place, gold medalist(s)	Wales	Adaptive Abilities Unified Pom (Performance Cheer)	1st	
2nd place, silver medalist(s)	England	Youth All Girl Advanced	2nd	
2nd place, silver medalist(s)	England	Youth Coed Advanced	2nd	
3rd place, bronze medalist(s)	England	Adaptive Abilities Unified - Median 3	3rd	
3rd place, bronze medalist(s)	England	Youth Hip Hop (Performance Cheer)	3rd	
	England	Junior Coed Elite	5th	
	Scotland	Youth Pom (Performance Cheer)	5th	
	England	Junior Hip Hop (Performance Cheer)	5th	
	Scotland	Youth All Girl Median	6th	
	England	All Girl Premier	6th	
	Scotland	Youth Hip Hop (Performance Cheer)	6th	
	Wales	Youth Pom (Performance Cheer)	6th	
	England	Doubles Pom (Performance Cheer)	6th	
	England	Doubles Hip Hop (Performance Cheer)	7th	
	Scotland	Junior Pom (Performance Cheer)	8th	
	England	Team Cheer Pom (Performance Cheer)	8th	
	England	Team Cheer Jazz (Performance Cheer)	8th	
	Scotland	Junior Hip Hop (Performance Cheer)	9th	
	Scotland	Team Cheer Hip Hop (Performance Cheer)	10th	
	England	Coed Premier	Semi-Finals	
	Scotland	Doubles Pom (Performance Cheer)	Semi-Finals	
	Wales	Doubles Pom (Performance Cheer)	Semi-Finals	
	Scotland	Team Cheer Jazz (Performance Cheer)	Semi-Finals	

==== IASF Cheerleading World Championships ====
Allstar teams can compete at a national level within the United Kingdom to win bids to qualify to attend the IASF Cheerleading World Championships each year.

The top teams in the United Kingdom travel to compete at the IASF World Championships, with the following teams achieving the following results in 2023:

	Gym/Program	Team	Country	Score	Place	Division
1st place, gold medalist(s)	Unity Allstars	Black	England	116.7	1st	International Open Coed Non-Tumbling 7
2nd place, silver medalist(s)	Coventry Dynamite	Ignite	England	137.9	2nd	International Open Large Coed 5
2nd place, silver medalist(s)	Rising Stars	Midnight	England	131.4	2nd	International Open Small Coed 5
2nd place, silver medalist(s)	Unity Allstars	Blush	England	111.8	2nd	International Open Non-Tumbling 7
3rd place, bronze medalist(s)	Unity Allstars	Ruby	England	128.15	3rd	International Global 6
3rd place, bronze medalist(s)	Crimson Heat	White Fang	England	126.65	3rd	International Open 5
	Unity Allstars	Royal	England	132.8	4th	International U18 Small Coed 5
	Bournemouth Elite	Hail	England	130.6	4th	International Open Large Coed 5
	SA Academy	Crush	England	128.25	4th	International Open 6
	ICE Athletics	Lady Ice	England	124.35	4th	International U18 5
	Coventry Dynamite	Bomb Squad	England	110.7	4th	International Open Coed Non-Tumbling 6
	Zodiac All Stars	Pink	England	116.85	5th	International Open 5
	Coventry Dynamite	Ammunition	England	122.75	5th	International Open Small Coed 6
	Vista Twisters	T5	England	122.7	5th	International Open Small Coed 5
	Rising Stars	Twilight	England	105.3	5th	International U18 5
	Crimson Heat	Empire	England	113.65	6th	International U18 Small Coed 5
	ICE Athletics	Subzero	England	110.1	6th	International Open Non-Tumbling 6
	Casablanca Cheer	Apollo	England	92.65	6th	International Open Large Coed 6
	Oblivion All Stars	X	England	125	7th	International Open Large Coed 5
	Gymfinity Sports Academy	Ladies of the Crown	Wales	124.65	7th	International Open 6
	Unity Allstars	Steel	England	106.5	7th	International Open Coed Non-Tumbling 6
	Crimson Heat	Fury	England	117.25	9th	International Open 6
	East Midlands Cheerleading Academy	EMCA Killer Queens	England	86.8	10th	International Open Non-Tumbling 6
	East Midlands Cheerleading Academy	EMCA C-Lebrities	England	98.4	11th	International Open Small Coed 5
	Marshals Cheer	Major 6	England	90.5	11th	International Open Coed Non-Tumbling 6
	Phoenix Stars Cheerleaders	PSC Gemini	England	103.5	12th	International Open 5
	Evolution Athletics	EVO6	England	90.2	14th	International Open Small Coed 6

2024 Cheerleading World Championships Results

	Gym/Program	Team	Country	Score	Place	Division
1st place, gold medalist(s)	Unity Allstars	Royal	England	136.8	1st	International U18 Small Coed 5
1st place, gold medalist(s)	Unity Allstars	Ruby	England	138.3	1st	International Global 6
1st place, gold medalist(s)	Unity Allstars	Black	England	129.8	1st	International Open Non-Tumbling Coed 7
2nd place, silver medalist(s)	Unity Allstars	Blush	England	112.3	2nd	International Open Non-Tumbling 7
3rd place, bronze medalist(s)	Coventry Dynamite	Lady Grenades	England	128.9	3rd	International U18 5
3rd place, bronze medalist(s)	Coventry Dynamite	Cov Coed	England	122.85	3rd	International Open Large Coed 5
3rd place, bronze medalist(s)	Gymfinity Sports Academy	Ladies of the Crown	WALES	125.25	3rd	International Open 6
	Crimson Heat	Empire	England	126.4	4th	International U18 Small Coed 5
	Crimson Heat	White Fang	England	127	4th	International Open 5
	Unity Allstars	Steel	England	120.85	4th	International Open Non-Tumbling Coed
	Crimson Heat	Majesty	England	122.6	5th	International U18 5
	Top Gun Allstars UK	IO5	England	125.3	5th	International Open 5
	Unity Allstars	Volt	England	119.1	5th	International Open Small Coed 5
	East Midlands Cheerleading Academy	Fame	England	108.75	5th	International Open Small Coed 6
	Coventry Dynamite	Bombsquad	England	118.65	5th	International Open Non-Tumbling Coed 6
	Crimson Heat	Fury	England	122.65	5th	International Global 6
	SA Academy	Neon	England	122.05	6th	International U18 5
	Coventry Dynamite	FIYA 5	England	124.5	6th	International Open 5
	Electric Athletics	Midnight	England	113.35	6th	International Open Small Coed 5
	Bournemouth Elite	Hail	England	115.05	6th	International Open Large Coed 5
	Gymfinity Sports Academy	Angels	Wales	114.35	7th	International U18 5
	Scorpions Allstars	Thunder	England	109.8	7th	International Open Small Coed 5
	Surrey Starlets	Astraea	England	116.25	7th	International Open 7
	East Midlands Cheerleading Academy	Killer Queens	England	102.55	7th	International Open Non-Tumbling 7
	ICE Athletics	Subzero	England	98.65	8th	International Open Non-Tumbling 6
	London Dynasty Cheer	Revolution	England	109.45	8th	International Open Non-Tumbling Coed 6
	Marshals Cheer	Generals	England	108.1	9th	International U18 Small Coed 5
	East Midlands Cheerleading Academy	C-Lebrities	England	104.15	9th	International Open Large Coed 5
	RSD	Legends	Wales	98.7	9th	International Open Small Coed 5
	Surrey Starlets	Allium	England	93.25	9th	International Open Non-Tumbling 6
	Trailblazer Allstars	INNOVA7E	England	88.6	9th	International Open Non-Tumbling 7
