= Butler Cave Conservation Society =

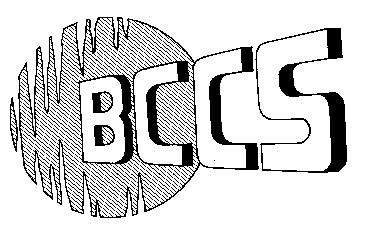

The Butler Cave Conservation Society (BCCS) is a 501(c)(3) non-profit Virginia corporation dedicated to the conservation, exploration, survey, preservation, and scientific study of the caves and karst in and around Burnsville Cove, Virginia.

The BCCS currently owns five preserves in Bath and Highland counties totaling 177.65 acres (0.7189 km^{2}). The preserves protect the entrances to Butler Cave, Bobcat Cave, Robins Rift, and other smaller caves in the Burnsville Cove. The preserves also protect the Steamer Hole Sink, the Glacier Dig Sink, and other karst features. As of January 2015, Butler Cave is the 40th longest cave in the United States, and the Chestnut Ridge Cave system (including Bobcat Cave) is the 30th longest cave in the US.

The BCCS assists the landowners of Breathing Cave and the Water Sinks Karst Preserve to assure caver access to these resources.

The Burnsville Cove has been designated a Significant Karst Area by the Virginia Department of Conservation and Recreation.

The BCCS is an affiliated cave conservancy of the National Speleological Society.

== History ==
The BCCS was formed by a group of Virginia and Pennsylvania cavers in 1968, making it the first cave conservancy in the United States. The idea of forming a society to protect and manage Butler Cave was formulated in July 1968 by Nevin C. and Thelma Davis, and Ike and Connie Nicholson, and the society was formed on 2 November 1968. The society then shortly leased the property containing the entrance to Butler Cave, and formally incorporated on 15 May 1970.

In the mid-1960s, Butler Cave was the longest known cave in Virginia. Being the longest cave in Virginia, the cave attracted much attention from recreational and exploratory cavers, and incidents of vandalism and trespassing grew. After forming in 1968, BCCS established an access policy to curb prior problems of vandalism and trespassing, and the policy was announced in the NSS News in 1971.

In February 1971, the BCCS began work on performing a comprehensive study of the caves and karst of Burnsville Cove (Virginia), and the study was published in The NSS Bulletin. The 101-page July 1982 NSS Bulletin was completely devoted to this topic.

In 1973, Butler Cave and Breathing Cave were designated as a National Natural Landmark by the National Park Service.

In 1975, the BCCS purchased the Butler Cave property.

In 2012, the BCCS made its third land acquisition, the 10-acre (4.0 ha) property containing the entrance to Robin's Rift.

In 2015, the book The Caves of Burnsville Cove, Virginia was published by Springer. This 479-page full color volume of the "Cave and Karst Systems of the World" series was edited by William B. White, a BCCS member, and the content was written by BCCS members and affiliated friends of the BCCS.

In 2015, the monograph Breathing Cave was published by the Virginia Speleological Society. This 88-page volume contains a number of chapters written by BCCS members.

In 2016, the BCCS established the Sinking Creek Grant, a program of small grants to encourage cave and karst scientific research in and around Burnsville Cove, Virginia.

In 2018, the BCCS purchased 7.8 acres in the Burnsville Cove containing the Steamer Hole (a sinkhole) and the historic Burnsville Postmasters House, establishing the Postmaster House Preserve.

In 2022, the BCCS acquired 10.85 acres in the Burnsville Cove known as the White-Wefer parcel. This land contains the Glacier Dig, a sinkhole in the vicinity of the famed Woodsall Sink.

== See also ==
- Caving
- Cave Conservancies
- Conservation movement
- List of conservation issues
- Speleology
