= British Cheerleading Association =

British sport governing body

The British Cheerleading Association was established in 1984 to educate on the activity of cheerleading in the UK. The BCA is now considered the governing body for cheerleading in the UK, and supports over 25,000 members.

== Competitions ==
The BCA hosts several cheerleading competitions a year, for all different levels, including;

- The Regional "Classics"
- The Regional "Schools"
- National Universities
- National Championships
- The Rocks! Series
