= BCA-TV =

- Country: Ireland
- Broadcast area: Dublin
- Headquarters: Dublin

Programming
- Language: English
- Picture format: 576i (4:3 SDTV)

Ownership
- Owner: Ballyfermot Community Association

History
- Launched: September 3, 1974; 51 years ago
- Closed: April 7, 1976; 49 years ago

BCA-TV was an early pirate television station in Ireland owned by the Ballyfermot Community Association between 1972 and 1976. The station was a joint between BCA and Phoenix Relays.

== History ==
In 1973, Phoenix Relays negotiated with the Ballyfermot Community Association to provide a local alternative to RTÉ; its main directors having previously worked with the corporation. Broadcasts started on 3 September 1974 at 8pm during Community Week. On 27 February 1975, RTÉ's Seven Days profiled the station. The station's offices were located in the same facilities as Phoenix Relays, the local relay TV company that collected rentals for "piped TV". The 1975 Community Week opened with a special mass from the Church of the Assumption in June, nine months after going on air.

BCA-TV was an illegal operation from the beginning. In order to advertise its programmes, Phoenix Relays had to cut commercial breaks on its relays of Ulster Television. Broadcasts were done weekly at 8 pm on Wednesday evenings and lasted an hour. Despite being featured on RTÉ, the minister of posts and telegraphs Conor Cruise O'Brien refused to give BCA-TV a licence, which was taken to the courts. The station eventually shut down on 7 April 1976 due to the high costs paid by Phoenix Relays to produce the programmes.

The logo of the station was a phoenix (from Phoenix Relays) inside a circle saying BCA-TV below, with five hands touching the circle. Occasionally, the design was accompanied by a COLOUR inscription below the circle as well as additional circles featuring three candles (to the right) and the harp, the national symbol of Ireland, to the left.
