= Beaver County Christian High School =

Location
- 510 37th Street; Beaver Falls, Pennsylvania 15010; United States
- Coordinates: 40.7784558°N 80.3262883°W

Information
- Type: Private school, high school
- Motto: Biblically Grounded for Life
- Religious affiliation: Protestant Christianity
- Established: 1969
- School district: Big Beaver Falls Area School District
- School code: A1101917
- Principal: Carolyn Brejwo
- Grades: 9-12
  - Grade 9: 24
  - Grade 10: 19
  - Grade 11: 21
  - Grade 12: 16
- Student to teacher ratio: 7.8
- Colors: Blue and White
- Athletics conference: Western Pennsylvania Interscholastic Athletic League
- Team name: Eagles
- Tuition: $10,435
- Athletic Director: Libby Michalik
- Website: www.bccspa.org

Beaver County Christian High School is a private non-denominational Christian high school in Beaver Falls, Pennsylvania established in 1969. Beaver County Christian is accredited by Christian Schools International. Their athletic teams compete as the BCCS Eagles in the Western Pennsylvania Interscholastic Athletic League.
