= Bay City Christian School =

Location
- 1840 Bond St; Green Bay, Wisconsin; US
- Coordinates: 44°32′29″N 88°3′59″W

Information
- Type: Christian Primary and Secondary
- Established: 1979
- Administrator: Michael Phillips
- Grades: Preschool–12
- Enrollment: 172
- Mascot: Bobcat
- Affiliation: Wisconsin Association of Christian Schools
- Website: baycitychristian.org

Bay City Christian School is a school in Green Bay, Wisconsin affiliated with the Bay City Baptist Church of Green Bay. It includes preschool through 12th grade. The school is a member of the Wisconsin Association of Christian Schools (WACS).

== History ==
In spring 2016, BCCS applied to become a part of the Wisconsin private school voucher program.

== Extracurricular activities ==
Soccer, basketball and volleyball are offered at BCCS. The school also offers drama opportunities and American Christian Honor Society.
