= BC =

BC most often refers to:

- Before Christ, a calendar era based on the traditionally reckoned year of the birth of Jesus of Nazareth
- British Columbia, the westernmost province of Canada

BC may also refer to:

== Arts and entertainment ==
- B.C. (comic strip), by Johnny Hart, also the title character
- BC (video game), a cancelled game from Lionhead Studios
- BC: The Archaeology of the Bible Lands, a BBC television series
- "B.C.", a song from the 1974 album Propaganda by Sparks
- Black Clover, a Japanese manga and anime series
- Bullet Club, a professional wrestling stable

== Businesses and organizations ==
- Basilian Chouerite Order of Saint John the Baptist, an order of the Greek Catholic Church
- BC Card, a Korean credit card company
- Bella Center, a conference center in Copenhagen, Denmark
- Brasseries du Cameroun, a brewery in Cameroon (also known as SABC)
- Brunswick Corporation (NYSE ticker symbol BC)

== Education ==
=== United States ===
- Bakersfield College, Bakersfield, California
- Bellevue College, Bellevue, Washington
- Benedictine College, Atchison, Kansas
- Benedictine Military School, a high school in Savannah, Georgia
- Bergen Catholic High School, Oradell, New Jersey
- Boston College, a university in Chestnut Hill, Massachusetts
  - Boston College Eagles, its athletic teams
- Brazosport College, Lake Jackson, Texas
- Broward College, Fort Lauderdale, Florida
- Brooklyn College, Brooklyn, New York

=== Elsewhere ===
- Baccalaureus or bc, a Bachelor's degree in the Netherlands
- Baghdad College, a high school in Baghdad, Iraq
- British Council

== Science and technology ==
- Backcrossing, a crossing of a hybrid with one of its parents, or a genetically similar individual
- Backward compatibility, the ability of new software to work similarly to its predecessor
- Baden culture, an archaeological culture in Europe
- Ballistic coefficient, a measure of air drag on a projectile
- Base curve radius, a parameter of a contact lens
- Battle command, a military discipline
- Bayonet cap, a standard light bulb connection
- bc (programming language), an arbitrary-precision calculator language
- Black carbon, a carbonaceous component of soot
- Bliss bibliographic classification, a library cataloguing system
- × Brassocattleya or Bc., an orchid genus
- Breadcoin, a community food token
- Buoyancy compensator (diving), a piece of scuba diving equipment

== Transportation ==
- NZR B^{C} class, a type of steam locomotive
- Skymark Airlines (IATA airline code BC)

== Other uses ==
- Banbridge Chronicle, Northern Irish newspaper
- Bullcrap, a phrase denoting something worthless
- Burr Chamberlain (1877–1933), American football player and coach
- Baguio, a city in the Philippines, locally abbreviated as "B.C."
- Baja California, a state of Mexico
- BC Powder, a brand of pain reliever
- BookCrossing, a website that encourages leaving books in public places to be found by others
- Botswana, WMO country code (and obsolete NATO and FIPS country codes)

== See also ==
- BC Cygni, a red supergiant star that is one of the largest stars
- Belaruskaja Čyhunka (BCh), the national railway company of Belarus
- Blind carbon copy (Bcc:), the practice of sending an e-mail to multiple recipients without disclosing the complete list of recipients
