= Nazira Aytbekova =

Kyrgyzstani television presenter

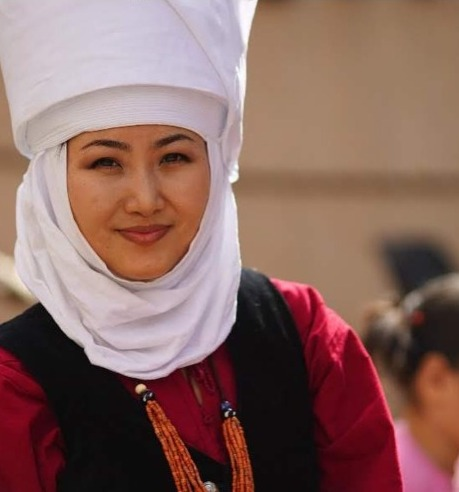
Aytbekova in 2022

Nazira Aytbekova (Kyrgyz: Назира Айтбекова) is a presenter for Kyrgyzstan state television. In 2012, she was reported to have been kidnapped at gunpoint and subjected to a mock execution. Reports stated that her attackers claimed the attack was a "practical joke" for another media outlet.
