= ShruthiUK =

- ShruthiUK
- Formation: 2005
- Founder: Dr. Chithra Ramakrishnan
- Founded at: Leeds
- Type: Nonprofit organization
- Location: Solihull, England, UK
- Website: www.shruthiuk.com

ShruthiUK is a Solihull-based non-profit South Asian arts and culture organisation.

== About the organisation ==
It was established in 2005 by Dr. Chithra Ramakrishnan in Leeds. It operates primarily in the West Midlands.

According to its website, it works with children and young adults to develop exposure to and recognition of Indian culture through music and dance. It also provides comprehensive training in South Indian classical dance and music to members of the surrounding community.

== British Carnatic Choir ==
In June 2015, ShruthiUK launched a first of its kind Carnatic Choir group with the aim of creating and exploring choral singing in the South Indian classical music genre.

== Birmingham Thyagaraja Festival ==
ShruthiUK also organizes the annual Birmingham Thyagaraja Festival, a Carnatic music festival in Solihull. The festival brings together aspiring singers, musicians and dancers performing the songs, rhythms and teachings of Saint Thyagaraja, a prominent Indian composer of Carnatic classical music.
