= Tax returns in Canada =

Obligatory forms that must be submitted to the Canada Revenue Agency

A tax return in Canada is a declaration filed by an individual or corporation reporting information used to calculate the income tax they owe. Federal tax returns are filed with the Canada Revenue Agency (CRA). Most provinces have their income taxes administered through the federal system, while residents of Quebec also file a separate provincial personal income tax return with Revenu Québec; Alberta and Quebec administer their own corporate income taxes.

For individuals, the normal filing deadline is April 30 of the following year, although different deadlines apply in some circumstances, including for self-employed taxpayers, returns for deceased individuals, and certain non-residents. Returns may be prepared using tax software and submitted to the CRA by mail or electronically through NETFILE.

== Who should file a Canadian tax return ==
Canadians who live abroad can sometimes continue filing a Canadian tax return, even if they are not required to do so. Three primary factors are used to determine a taxpayer's tax residence: dwelling place (or places), spouse or common-law partner and dependants.

== Due date ==
Normally, Canadian individual tax returns for any specific year must be filed by April 30 of the following year. There is no provision for generally extending this deadline, but there are a few exceptions.

- Tax returns for self-employed individuals and their spouses must be filed by June 15 of the following year. However, any Goods and Services Tax/Harmonized Sales Tax owing for the period is due April 30.
- Tax returns for deceased individuals must be filed by the normal filing deadline or 6 months after the date of death, whichever comes later. Example: Mary dies on January 30, 2004; her 2003 return is due on July 30, 2004 (six months later) and her 2004 return is due on April 30, 2005 (normal filing deadline). This provision is also extended to the surviving spouse.
- Tax returns for non-residents electing to file under section 217 are due June 30 of the following year.
- By virtue of the Interpretation Act the due date of all individual returns is moved to the next business day when the normal due date falls on a Sunday or Holiday. Although ministerial orders are also used to apply this to Saturday due dates, it is not a legal requirement.
- The Federal Finance Minister may extend the deadline in cases of emergency situations such as floods, etc.

== Provincial returns ==
Most provinces employ a system of federal-provincial agreements whereby the tax is collected on behalf of a province by the federal government. Quebec is the only province that collects provincial personal income taxes by their agency. Thus, Quebec residents file tax returns with both Revenu Québec and the Canada Revenue Agency. Alberta and Quebec collect their own corporate income tax. Filing deadlines generally match those of the federal government.

== Tax return software and online filing ==
Tax returns can be prepared using various commercial software or online. The returns can be either printed and sent to CRA by mail or submitted to CRA electronically through a government service called NETFILE. Some tax preparation companies allow customers to file tax returns for free.

The biggest tax preparation companies in Canada are H&R Block and Intuit, the maker of TurboTax.

== See also ==
- Canadian efile
- T1 General (form used for individual filing)
- Tax return (Australia)
- Tax return (United Kingdom)
- Tax return (United States)
