= Taxation in Canada =

Government revenue systems at all levels

Taxation in Canada involves the assessment and collection of taxes at each level of government, including federally, provincially and territorially, and locally. The collection of federal, provincial and territorial income taxes is mainly administered by the federal government through the Canada Revenue Agency, which then remits the provincial and territorial shares to the relevant provinces and territories. The exception is Quebec, where Revenu Québec administers the collection of provincial income tax.

Taxes are levied on various income sources, including income, payroll, property, sales, capital gains, dividends, imports, among others; various fees are additionally imposed. As of 2024, taxes collected at the federal, provincial and territorial, and local levels of government amounted to 34.9% of the country's total GDP, above the OECD average of 34.1% of GDP.

The income tax policy of Canada is based on the progressive model of taxation, with individuals and businesses paying a higher percentage of tax as the amount of income earned increases.

== Constitutional authority ==
Under the Constitution Act, 1867, taxation powers are vested in the Parliament of Canada under s. 91(3) for:

(3) The raising of Money by any Mode or System of Taxation.

The provincial legislatures have a more restricted authority under ss. 92(2) for:

(2) Direct Taxation within the Province in order to the raising of a Revenue for Provincial Purposes.

The provinces also have a taxation power relating to provincial natural resources, set out in s. 92A of the Constitution Act, 1867:

92A (4) In each province, the legislature may make laws in relation to the raising of money by any mode or system of taxation in respect of
(a) non-renewable natural resources and forestry resources in the province and the primary production therefrom, and
(b) sites and facilities in the province for the generation of electrical energy and the production therefrom,

whether or not such production is exported in whole or in part from the province, but such laws may not authorize or provide for taxation that differentiates between production exported to another part of Canada and production not exported from the province.

In turn, the provincial legislatures have authorized municipal councils to levy specific types of direct tax, such as property tax.

The powers of taxation are circumscribed by ss. 53 and 54 (both extended to the provinces by s. 90), and 125, which state:

53 Bills for appropriating any Part of the Public Revenue, or for imposing any Tax or Impost, shall originate in the House of Commons.

54 It shall not be lawful for the House of Commons to adopt or pass any Vote, Resolution, Address, or Bill for the Appropriation of any Part of the Public Revenue, or of any Tax or Impost, to any Purpose that has not been first recommended to that House by Message of the Governor General in the Session in which such Vote, Resolution, Address, or Bill is proposed.

...

125 No Lands or Property belonging to Canada or any Province shall be liable to Taxation.

== Nature of the taxation power in Canada ==
Since the 1930 Supreme Court of Canada ruling in Lawson v. Interior Tree Fruit and Vegetables Committee of Direction, taxation is held to consist of the following characteristics:

- it is enforceable by law;
- imposed under the authority of the legislature;
- levied by a public body; and
- intended for a public purpose.

In order for a tax to be validly imposed, it must meet the requirements of s. 53 of the Constitution Act, 1867, but the authority for such imposition may be delegated within certain limits. Major J noted in Re Eurig Estate:

In my view, the rationale underlying s. 53 is somewhat broader. The provision codifies the principle of no taxation without representation, by requiring any bill that imposes a tax to originate with the legislature. My interpretation of s. 53 does not prohibit Parliament or the legislatures from vesting any control over the details and mechanism of taxation in statutory delegates such as the Lieutenant Governor in Council. Rather, it prohibits not only the Senate, but also any other body other than the directly elected legislature, from imposing a tax on its own accord.

This was endorsed by Iacobucci J in Ontario English Catholic Teachers' Assn. v. Ontario (Attorney General), and he further stated:

The delegation of the imposition of a tax is constitutional if express and unambiguous language is used in making the delegation. The animating principle is that only the legislature can impose a new tax ab initio. But if the legislature expressly and clearly authorizes the imposition of a tax by a delegated body or individual, then the requirements of the principle of “no taxation without representation” will be met. In such a situation, the delegated authority is not being used to impose a completely new tax, but only to impose a tax that has been approved by the legislature. The democratic principle is thereby preserved in two ways. First, the legislation expressly delegating the imposition of a tax must be approved by the legislature. Second, the government enacting the delegating legislation remains ultimately accountable to the electorate at the next general election.

=== Taxation vs regulatory charge ===
In Westbank First Nation v. British Columbia Hydro and Power Authority, the SCC declared that a government levy would be in pith and substance a tax if it was "unconnected to any form of a regulatory scheme." The test for a regulatory fee set out in Westbank requires:

- a complete, complex and detailed code of regulation;
- a regulatory purpose which seeks to affect some behaviour;
- the presence of actual or properly estimated costs of the regulation; and
- a relationship between the person being regulated and the regulation, where the person being regulated either benefits from, or causes the need for, the regulation.

In 620 Connaught Ltd. v. Canada (Attorney General), the Westbank framework was qualified to require "a relationship between the charge and the scheme itself." This has resulted in situations where an imposition can be characterized as neither a valid regulatory charge nor a valid tax. In Confédération des syndicats nationaux v. Canada (Attorney General), a funding scheme for employment insurance that was intended to be self-financing instead generated significant surpluses that were not used to reduce EI premiums in accordance with the legislation. It was therefore held to be contrary to the federal unemployment insurance power under s. 91(2A) and thus not a valid regulatory charge, and there was no clear authority in certain years for setting such excess rates, so it was not a valid tax.

=== Direct vs indirect taxation ===
The question of whether a tax is "direct taxation" (and thus falling within provincial jurisdiction) was summarized by the Judicial Committee of the Privy Council in Attorney General for Quebec v Reed, where Lord Selborne stated:

The question whether it is a direct or indirect tax cannot depend on those special events which may vary in particular cases; but the best general rule is to look to the time of payment; and if at the time the ultimate incidence is uncertain, then, as it appears to their Lordships, it cannot, in this view, be called direct taxation within the meaning of [s. 92(2)]...

"Indirect taxation" has been summarized by Rand J in Canadian Pacific Railway Co. v. Attorney General for Saskatchewan in these words:

In Esquimalt, Lord Greene ... speaks of the "fundamental difference" between the "economic tendency" of an owner to try to shift the incidence of a tax and the "passing on" of the tax regarded as the hallmark of an indirect tax. In relation to commodities in commerce, I take this to lie in the agreed conceptions of economists of charges which fall into the category of accumulating items: and the question is, what taxes, through intention and expectation, are to be included in those items? If the tax is related or relateable, directly or indirectly, to a unit of the commodity or its price, imposed when the commodity is in course of being manufactured or marketed, then the tax tends to cling as a burden to the unit or the transaction presented to the market. However much, in any case, these may be actually "intended" or "expected" to be passed on, it is now settled that they are to be so treated.

When the definition of "direct taxation" is read with s. 92(2)'s requirement that it be levied "within the Province", it has been held that:

- provincial taxes must fasten onto provincially located persons, property or transactions, or to extraprovincial persons conducting economic activity within the province
- they may not be levied on goods destined for export
- they must not impede the flow of interprovincial trade

=== Licensing fees and regulatory charges ===
Allard Contractors Ltd. v. Coquitlam (District) held that:

- provincial legislatures may charge a fee that is of an indirect nature, where it is supportable as ancillary or adhesive to a valid regulatory scheme under a provincial head of power.
- in obiter, La Forest J's observation was cited with approval that s. 92(9) (together with the provincial powers over property and civil rights and matters of a local or private nature) allows for the levying of license fees even if they constitute indirect taxation.

== Administration ==
Federal taxes are collected by the Canada Revenue Agency (CRA). Under tax collection agreements, the CRA collects and remits to the provinces:

- provincial personal income taxes on behalf of all provinces except Quebec, through a system of unified tax returns.
- corporate taxes on behalf of all provinces except Quebec and Alberta.
- the portion of the Harmonized Sales Tax that is in excess of the federal Goods and Services Tax (GST) rate, with respect to the provinces that have implemented it.

Revenu Québec collects the GST in Quebec on behalf of the federal government, and remits it back to the federal government.

Note: This table is illegible in mobile view.

Department of Customs (Note: SC 31 Vict., c. 43)
Department of National Revenue
Canada Revenue Agency
Department of Inland Revenue (Note: SC 31 Vict., c. 49)
Canada Border Services Agency
│
1867
│
1887
│
1907
│
1927
│
1947
│
1967
│
1987
│
2007
│
2027
│
2047
Timeline of Canadian federal tax administration

== Income taxes ==
The Parliament of Canada entered the field with the passage of the Business Profits War Tax Act, 1916 (essentially a tax on larger businesses, chargeable on any accounting periods ending after 1914 and before 1918). It was replaced in 1917 by the Income War Tax Act, 1917 (covering personal and corporate income earned from 1917 onwards). Similar taxes were imposed by the provinces in the following years.

Province	Introduction of personal income tax	Introduction of corporate income tax	Tax collection assumed by federal government	Personal tax collection resumed by province	Corporate tax collection resumed by province	Corporate tax collection resumed by federal government
British Columbia	1876	1901	1941 (Note: introduced under the Wartime Tax Rental Agreement)			
Alberta	1932 (Note: "The Income Tax Act, SA 1932, c. 5".)	1932	1941		1981	
Saskatchewan	1932	1932	1941			
Manitoba	1923	1924	1938 (Note: SM 1937, c. 43; SM 1937–38, c. 39)			
Ontario	1936 (Note: SO 1936, c. 1)	1932 (Note: SO 1932, c. 8)	1936 (Note: SO 1936, c. 1, s. 76, subsequently authorized by Order in Council P.C. 1081 of May 14, 1937)		1947	2009
Québec	1939	1932	1940 (Note: Loi de l'impôt de Québec sur le revenu, SQ 1940, c. 16)	1954 (Note: Provincial Income Tax Act, SQ 1953-54, c. 17)	1947 (Note: Corporation Tax Act, SQ 1947, c. 33)	
New Brunswick			1941			
Nova Scotia			1941			
Prince Edward Island	1894	1894	1938 (Note: SPEI 1937, c. 18; SPEI 1938, c. 10)			
Newfoundland and Labrador			1949			

Municipal income taxes existed as well in certain municipalities, but such taxation powers were gradually abolished as the provinces established their own collection régimes, and none survived the Second World War, as a consequence of the Wartime Tax Rental Agreements.

- From 1850, municipal councils in Ontario possessed authority to levy taxes on income, where such amount was greater than the value of a taxpayer's personal property. The personal property limitation was removed with the passage of the Assessment Act in 1904. By 1936, some 200 councils ranging in size from Toronto to Blenheim Township were collecting such taxes. Toronto levied personal income taxes until 1936, and corporate income taxes until 1944.
- From 1855 to 1870, and once more from 1939, income tax was imposed on residents of Quebec City. In 1935, a municipal income tax was imposed on the income of individuals resident or doing business in Montreal and the municipalities of the Montreal Metropolitan Commission. Similar income taxes were also imposed in Sherbrooke from 1886 to 1912, in Sorel from 1889, and Hull from 1893.
- In Prince Edward Island, Summerside had an income tax from 1870 to 1880, and Charlottetown imposed one from 1880 to 1888.
- While Nova Scotia permitted municipal income tax in 1835, Halifax was the first municipality to levy one in 1849.
- New Brunswick allowed the collection of income taxes in 1831. However, serious enforcement did not begin until 1849, but it was only in 1908 when all municipalities in the province were required to collect it.

=== Personal income taxes ===
Both the federal and provincial governments have imposed income taxes on individuals, and these are the most significant sources of revenue for those levels of government accounting for over 45% of tax revenue. The federal government charges the bulk of income taxes with the provinces charging a somewhat lower percentage, except in Quebec. Income taxes throughout Canada are progressive with the high income residents paying a higher percentage than the low income.

Where income is earned in the form of a capital gain, only half of the gain is included in income for tax purposes; the other half is not taxed.

Settlements and legal damages are generally not taxable, even in circumstances where damages (other than unpaid wages) arise as a result of breach of contract in an employment relationship.

Federal and provincial income tax rates are shown at Canada Revenue Agency's website.

Personal income tax can be deferred in a Registered Retirement Savings Plan (RRSP) (which may include mutual funds and other financial instruments) that are intended to help individuals save for their retirement. Tax-Free Savings Accounts allow people to hold financial instruments without taxation on the income earned.

=== Corporate taxes ===
Companies and corporations pay corporate tax on profit income and on capital. These make up a relatively small portion of total tax revenue. Tax is paid on corporate income at the corporate level before it is distributed to individual shareholders as dividends. A tax credit is provided to individuals who receive dividend to reflect the tax paid at the corporate level. This credit does not eliminate double taxation of this income completely, however, resulting in a higher level of tax on dividend income than other types of income. (Where income is earned in the form of a capital gain, only half of the gain is included in income for tax purposes; the other half is not taxed.)

Corporations may deduct the cost of capital following capital cost allowance regulations. The Supreme Court of Canada has interpreted the Capital Cost Allowance in a fairly broad manner, allowing deductions on property which was owned for a very brief period of time, and property which is leased back to the vendor from which it originated.

Starting in 2002, several large companies converted into "income trusts" in order to reduce or eliminate their income tax payments, making the trust sector the fastest-growing in Canada as of 2005. Conversions were largely halted on October 31, 2006, when Finance Minister Jim Flaherty announced that new income trusts would be subject to a tax system similar to that of corporations, and that these rules would apply to existing income trusts after 2011.

Capital tax is a tax charged on a corporation's taxable capital. Taxable capital is the amount determined under Part 1.3 of the Income Tax Act (Canada) plus accumulated other comprehensive income.

On January 1, 2006, capital tax was eliminated at the federal level. Some provinces continued to charge corporate capital taxes, but effective July 1, 2012, provinces have stopped levying corporation capital taxes. In Ontario the corporate capital tax was eliminated July 1, 2010 for all corporations, although it was eliminated effective January 1, 2007, for Ontario corporations primarily engaged in manufacturing or resource activities. In British Columbia the corporate capital tax was eliminated as of April 1, 2010.

From 1932 until 1951, Canadian companies were able to file consolidated tax returns, but this was repealed with the introduction of the business loss carryover rules. In 2010, the Department of Finance launched consultations to investigate whether corporate taxation on a group basis should be reintroduced. As no consensus was reached in such consultations, it was announced in the 2013 Budget that moving to a formal system of corporate group taxation was not a priority at this time.

=== International taxation ===
Canadian residents and corporations pay income taxes based on their world-wide income. Canadians are in principle protected against double taxation receiving income from certain countries which gave agreements with Canada through the foreign tax credit, which allows taxpayers to deduct from their Canadian income tax otherwise payable from the income tax paid in other countries. A citizen who is currently not a resident of Canada may petition the CRA to change her or his status so that income from outside Canada is not taxed.

Non-residents of Canada with taxable earnings in Canada (e.g. rental income and property disposition income) are required to pay Canadian income tax on these amounts. Rents paid to non-residents are subject to a 25% withholding tax on the “gross rents”, which is required to be withheld and remitted to the CRA by the payer (i.e. the Canadian agent of the non-resident, or if there is no agent, the renter of the property) each time rental receipts are paid or credited to the account of the non-resident by the payer. If the payer does not remit the required withholding taxes by the 15th day following the month of payment to the non-resident, the payer will be subject to penalties and interest on the unpaid amounts.

=== Payroll taxes ===
Employers are required to remit various types of payroll taxes to the different jurisdictions they operate in:

Jurisdiction	Type
Federal	Canada Pension Plan; Employment Insurance
Ontario	Employer Health Tax
Quebec	Quebec Pension Plan; Quebec Parental Insurance Plan; Workforce Skills Development and Recognition Fund; Compensation Tax
BC	Employers Health Tax
All provinces	Workers' compensation premiums

== Consumption taxes ==
=== Sales taxes ===
The federal government levies a value-added tax of 5%, called the Goods and Services Tax (GST), and, in five provinces, the Harmonized Sales Tax (HST). The provinces of British Columbia, Saskatchewan, and Manitoba levy a retail sales tax, and Quebec levies its own value-added tax, which is called the Quebec Sales Tax. The province of Alberta and the territories of Nunavut, Yukon, and Northwest Territories do not levy sales taxes of their own.

Retail sales taxes were introduced in the various provinces on these dates:

Evolution of sales tax régimes by jurisdiction
Province	Introduction of PST	Initial PST rate	Last PST rate	PST repealed	Conversion to HST	Conversion to QST	Reversion to PST
British Columbia	1948	3%	7%		2010		2013
Alberta	1936 (Note: "Ultimate Purchasers Tax Act, SA 1936, c. 7".)	2%	2%	1937 (Note: "An Act to amend the Ultimate Purchasers Tax Act, SA 1937 (2nd Session), c. 6".)			
Saskatchewan	1937	2%	6%				
Manitoba	1964 (Note: originally a Revenue Tax charged on a select list of supplies, replaced by a more general retail sales tax in 1967 - Ontario Committee on Taxation. Vol. III. 1967. pp. 212–213. Archived from the original on March 12, 2016.)	5%	7%				
Ontario	1961	3%	8%		2010		
Québec	1940 (Note: Quebec municipalities, beginning with Montreal in 1935 (SQ 1935, ch. 112), levied their own sales tax at the rate of 2%, which continued until 1964.)	2%	9.5%			2012	
New Brunswick	1950	4%	11%		1997		
Nova Scotia	1959	3%	11%		1997		
Prince Edward Island	1960	4%	10%		2013		
Newfoundland and Labrador	1950	3%	12%		1997		

==== Current sales tax rates ====
Current sales tax rates by jurisdiction
Province	HST	GST	PST	Total Tax
British Columbia		5%	7%	12%
Alberta		5%		5%
Saskatchewan		5%	6%	11%
Manitoba		5%	7%	12%
Ontario	13%			13%
Québec		5%	9.975%	14.975%
New Brunswick	15%			15%
Nova Scotia	14%			14%
Prince Edward Island	15%			15%
Newfoundland and Labrador	15%			15%

=== Excise taxes ===
The federal government imposes excise taxes on inelastic goods such as cigarettes, gasoline, alcohol, and for vehicle air conditioners. Provincial governments impose sales taxes on these goods, payable by the purchaser at retail. Canada has some of the highest rates of taxes on cigarettes and alcohol in the world, constituting a substantial share of the retail total price of cigarettes and alcohol paid by consumers. These are sometimes referred to as sin taxes. It is generally accepted that higher prices help deter consumption of these items, which increase health care costs stemming from their use.

The vehicle air conditioner tax is currently set at $100 per air conditioning unit.

Year for introduction of taxes on motor fuels
Jurisdiction	Fuel tax	Carbon tax	Local fuel tax
Federal	1975 (Note: During 1941–1947, there had been a temporary excise tax in effect.)		
British Columbia	1923	2008 (Note: Carbon Tax Act, SBC 2008, c. 40)	1999 (Metro Vancouver) 2010 (Capital Regional District)
Alberta	1922	2017	
Saskatchewan	1928		
Manitoba	1923		
Ontario	1925 (Note: The Gasoline Tax Act, SO 1925, c. 28)	2017	
Quebec	1924	2007 (Note: An Act respecting the implementation of the Québec Energy Strategy and amending various legislative provisions, 2006, c. 46)	1996 (Montreal Metropolitan Community)
New Brunswick	1926		
Nova Scotia	1926		
Prince Edward Island	1924		
Newfoundland	before Confederation		

At the federal level, Canada has imposed other excise taxes in the past:

- From 1915 to 1953, on the issue of cheques and other commercial paper.
- From 1920 to 1927, on advances of money
- From 1920 to 1953, on the transfer of securities. Initially applying to shares, it was extended to cover bonds and related items in 1922.
- From 1923 to 1926, on the issue of receipts.

== Capital gains tax ==
A Capital gains tax was first introduced in Canada by Pierre Trudeau and his finance minister Edgar Benson in the 1971 Canadian federal budget.

Some exceptions apply, such as selling one's primary residence which may be exempt from taxation. Capital gains made by investments in a Tax-Free Savings Account (TFSA) are not taxed.

Since the 2013 budget, interest can no longer be claimed as a capital gain. The formula is the same for capital losses and these can be carried forward indefinitely to offset future years' capital gains; capital losses not used in the current year can also be carried back to the previous three tax years to offset capital gains tax paid in those years.

If one's income is primarily derived from capital gains then it may not qualify for the 50% multiplier and will instead be taxed at the full income tax rate. CRA has a number of criteria to determine whether this will be the case.

For corporations as for individuals, 50% of realized capital gains are taxable. The net taxable capital gains (which can be calculated as 50% of total capital gains minus 50% of total capital losses) are subject to income tax at normal corporate tax rates. If more than 50% of a small business's income is derived from specified investment business activities (which include income from capital gains) they are not permitted to claim the small business deduction.

Capital gains earned on income in a Registered Retirement Savings Plan are not taxed at the time the gain is realized (i.e. when the holder sells a stock that has appreciated inside of their RRSP) but they are taxed when the funds are withdrawn from the registered plan (usually after being converted to a Registered Income Fund at the age of 71.) These gains are then taxed at the individual's full marginal rate.

Capital gains earned on income in a TFSA are not taxed at the time the gain is realized. Any money withdrawn from a TFSA, including capital gains, are also not taxed.

Unrealized capital gains are not taxed.

=== Capital Gains on a Primary Residence ===
Primary residences are exempt from capital gains. Any gains from selling a primary residence will not be considered a capital gain for taxation purposes. Any losses are also not considered, and cannot be used to offset previous, current, or future capital gains.

If a property is designated as a primary residence for only a part of the time held, the exemption will only apply to any price appreciation or loss during the time it was a primary residence. Usually, any price appreciation or loss at the time of sale will be divided evenly across the time the property was held. The price appreciation or loss during the time the property was not a primary residence will be subject to treatment as capital gains.

== Property, gift and succession taxes ==
=== Property taxes ===
There are two main types of property taxes: the annual tax and land transfer tax.

Annual Property Tax

The municipal level of government is funded largely by property taxes on residential, industrial and commercial properties; when the municipal council determines the financial budget for the year, they predict an expected revenue that needs to be funded by property tax for municipal services and decide a municipal tax rate that will allow them to achieve the revenue amount. The annual property tax is usually a percentage of the taxable assessed value of the property which is commonly determined by the assessment service provider of the municipality. The annual property tax for any province contains at least two elements: the municipal rate and the education rate. The combination of municipal and education tax portions along with any base taxes or other special taxes determines the full amount of the tax. These taxes account for about ten percent of total taxation in Canada.

Land Transfer Tax

Land transfer tax is due upon the closing of a transfer of property and is calculated based on the market value of the property at a marginal tax rate, although exceptions are determined on a provincial level. Toronto has the highest land transfer tax rates in Canada as it levies an additional land transfer tax equal in value to the Ontario land transfer tax. Alberta and Saskatchewan do not charge land transfer tax. To provide relief for the high costs of land transfer tax, some provinces provide rebates for first-time home buyers:

- In BC and Ontario, a First Time Home Buyers’ Program is offered to refund a portion of the land transfer tax
- In Prince Edward Island, all qualifying first-time home buyers are exempt from paying the tax entirely
- In Montreal, the Montreal Home Ownership Program provides a lump-sum subsidy for purchasing a first home

=== Gift tax ===
Gift tax was first imposed by the Parliament of Canada in 1935 as part of the Income War Tax Act. It was repealed at the end of 1971, but rules governing the tax on capital gains that then came into effect include gifts as deemed dispositions made at fair market value, that come within their scope.

=== Estate tax ===
Estate taxes have been held to be valid "direct taxation within the province," but they cannot be charged where property is left outside the province to beneficiaries who are neither resident nor domiciled in the province. Succession duties were in effect in the various provinces at the following times:

Province	Introduced	Repealed
Ontario	1892	1979
Quebec	1892	1986
New Brunswick	1892	1974
Nova Scotia	1892	1974
Manitoba	1893	1977
Prince Edward Island	1894	1971
British Columbia	1894	1977
Saskatchewan	1905	1977
Alberta	1905	1947
Newfoundland	before Confederation	1974

Estate taxes, which were not subject to the territorial limitations that affected provincial taxation, were first introduced at the federal level under the Dominion Succession Duty Act in 1941, which was later replaced by the Estate Tax Act in 1958. The latter was repealed at the end of 1971. From 1947 to 1971, there was a complicated set of federal-provincial revenue-sharing arrangements, where:

- In Newfoundland, Prince Edward Island, Nova Scotia, New Brunswick, and Manitoba, the federal government collected estate taxes at full rates, but remitted 75% of the revenues derived from each of those provinces;
- In Alberta and Saskatchewan, the federal government collected estate taxes at full rates, but remitted 75% of the revenues derived from each of those provinces, which was rebated back to the estate;
- In British Columbia, the federal government collected estate taxes at only 25% of the full rate, and the province continued to levy its own succession duty;
- In Ontario and Quebec, the federal government collected estate taxes at only 50% of the full rate, and remitted 50% of such collections to such provinces, and the provinces continued to levy their own succession duties.

Upon the repeal of the federal estate tax in 1972, the income tax régime was altered to incorporate consequences arising from the death of a taxpayer, which may result in tax being owed:

- the property of an estate is said to have incurred a "deemed disposition" at fair market value, thus triggering liability for capital gains and other inclusions into income
- certain deductions and deferrals are available with respect to capital gains
- several options are available for applying any outstanding net capital losses
- income earned or accrued up to the date of death is taxed on the final tax return of the deceased at normal tax rates, but there are several additional optional tax returns that may be filed as well for certain types of income
- income earned after the date of death is to be declared on a separate return filed by the trust for the estate
- beneficiaries are taxed on amounts paid from Registered Retirement Savings Plans and registered retirement income funds, but certain rollover reliefs are available

== See also ==
- Dividend tax
- Fiscal neutrality
- Goods and Services Tax (Canada) (GST)
- Registered Retirement Savings Plan (RRSP)
- Surrogatum Principle
- Canadian federal budget
- Digital services tax in Canada
