= Electronic tax filing =

Electronic tax filing, or e-filing, is a system for submitting tax documents to a revenue service electronically, often without the need to submit any paper documents.

Electronic tax filing may refer to:

- IRS e-file, a United States system for federal income tax
- NETFILE, a Canada Revenue Agency system for consumers
- EFILE, a Canada Revenue Agency system for professional tax preparers

== See also ==
- E-file (disambiguation)
