= Scientific Research and Experimental Development Tax Credit Program =

Canadian tax program

The Canadian Scientific Research and Experimental Development Tax Incentive Program (SRED or SR&ED) provides support in the form of tax credits and refunds to corporations, partnerships or individuals who conduct scientific research or experimental development in Canada.

== Background ==
Industrial tax incentives in Canada have been in place since at least 1944. A 1989 report prepared by Odette Madore, Govt of Canada Economics Division, summarizes the history of R&D tax policy.

- 1944-1986 - traditional tax deductions for R&D, introduced R&D tax credits,
- 1987-1993 - mitigated abuses and simplified administration
- 1994–present - clarified definition of experimental development, broadened eligibility re Qualified Small Businesses, allowed proxy calculation for overhead, conducted major review in 1998, simplified forms, conducted major review in 2010
- Oct 2011 The Canadian government commissioned an expert panel to conduct a comprehensive Review of Federal Support to Research and Development.

The SR&ED program is intended to encourage businesses of all sizes, particularly small to medium and start-up firms, to conduct research and development (R&D) that will lead to new, improved, or technologically advanced products, processes, devices, and materials. The Canadian SR&ED tax incentive is the government's largest single support program for R&D. Canada has one of the more generous R&D programs among OECD countries.

"Each year the SR&ED program provides over $4 billion in investment tax credits (ITCs) to over 18,000 claimants. Of these, about 75% are small businesses." (CRA RC4472) An expert panel appointed by the federal government recently recommended that the federal government consider redirecting some of the funds allocated to the SR&ED program to ensure that enough supports exist for larger businesses interested in taking innovations to the global market place. The SR&ED program produces less of an incentive as firms grow, since the maximum benefit any single firm can receive from the program is fixed, and not proportional to firm size.

SR&ED expenditures are deducted as business expenses, and may also qualify for investment tax credits that are received in the form of a reduction in income taxes payable, cash refunds, or both. Qualifying expenditures may include wages, expenditures for materials, equipment leases and overhead that are directly related to R&D, and 80% of the cost of eligible work by contractors. Capital equipment and equipment lease expenditures made after 1 January 2014, are not eligible. The following activities constitute SR&ED:

- Experimental development - technological advancement
- Applied research - advancement of knowledge for a practical purpose
- Basic research - advancement of knowledge for its own sake
- Eligible support work: engineering, design, operations research, mathematical analysis, computer programming, data collection, testing and psychological research

The following activities are not eligible for the SR&ED program: marketing & sales, routine testing, research in social sciences or humanities, commercial production, style changes, routine data collection, petroleum or natural gas exploration/drilling.

In order to claim such expenditures, an assessment on scientific or technological eligibility of the claimed activities needs to be performed, according to three criteria:

- Scientific or technological uncertainty: Technological obstacles / uncertainties are the technological problems or unknowns that cannot be overcome by applying the techniques, procedures and data that are generally accessible to competent professionals in the field.
- Scientific and technical content: A systematic investigation entails going from identification and articulation of the scientific or technological obstacles/uncertainties, hypothesis formulation, through testing by experimentation or analysis, to the statement of logical conclusions. In a business context, this requires that the objectives of the scientific research or experimental development work must be clearly stated at an early stage in the evolution of the project, and the method of addressing the scientific or technological obstacle/uncertainty by experimentation or analysis must be clearly set out.
- Scientific or technological advancement: The search carried out in the experimental development activity must generate information that advances your understanding of the underlying technologies. In a business context, this means that when a new or improved material, device, product or process is created, it must embody a technological advancement in order to be eligible. In other words, the work must attempt to increase the technology base or level from where it was at the beginning of the project.

The Department of Finance is responsible for the legislation that governs the SR&ED program. The Income Tax Act defines SR&ED. The Canada Revenue Agency (CRA) is responsible for its administration. The CRA Information Circular 86-4R3 is a key document that provides technical guidelines to clarify and interpret the language in the tax act. CRA Interpretation Bulletin IT-151-R4 is a key document that explains SR&ED expenditures.

== Investment Tax Credit ==
Federally, the maximum Investment Tax Credit (ITC) depends on the company's legal status and amount of qualified expenditures for SR&ED carried out in Canada.

- Canadian-controlled private corporation (CCPC): the ITC is 35% of the first $3 million in qualified expenditures, and 15% on any excess amount.
- Other Canadian corporations, proprietorships, partnerships, and trusts: the ITC is 15% of all qualified expenditures.

In addition, each province or territory may also provide provincial or territorial tax credits (subject to a cap) to qualifying corporations carrying out SR&ED in their respective province or territory:

Provincial / Territorial Investment Tax Credits
Province/Territory	Rate
Alberta	10%
British Columbia	10%
Manitoba	20%
New Brunswick	15%
Newfoundland and Labrador	15%
Northwest Territories
Nova Scotia	15%
Nunavut
Ontario	10%
Prince Edward Island
Quebec	30%
Saskatchewan	15%
Yukon Territory	20%

Provinces and territories may offer alternative or supplemental investment programs. Examples:

- Alberta offers funding through its science and research investments grant program.
- Prince Edward Island offers grants (non-repayable contributions) under various funds.
- Northwest Territories and Nunavut provide a 15% tax credit under the Risk Capital Investment Tax Credits Act.

== Changes to Form T661 ==
For tax years ending after 31 December 2008, CRA will only accept the new 2008 version of the Form T661. Significant changes include modifications to the “Part 2 project information” section that details the scientific and technological aspects of the SR&ED projects claimed, which has been restructured from free-flowing questions to a direct question format.

In 2010, the CRA made minor revisions to Form T661 (10), to clarify some of the instructions and move the expenditure summaries from T661 Part 2 to a new summary section, T661 Part 6.

In 2013, The CRA made additional changes to the T661, where Consultants are now required to provide their agreement and the amount they charge to clients in return for filing claims on their behalf.

Stemming from the Budget approval of November 17, 2025, the following document was published by the Department of Finance Canada that details all changes to the Income Tax Act.

== Self-Assessment and Learning Tool (SALT) ==
The SALT is CRA's web-based tool that is used to determine through a series of concise questions if work performed has a likelihood of meeting SR&ED requirements for funding. The SALT is mainly intended for potential claimants in the small to medium business sector, and for those who are new to the SR&ED program. SALT is an enhanced version of the previous tool, ESAT (Eligibility Self‑assessment Tool).

== The SR&ED Application Process ==
Canada Revenue Agency (CRA) and corresponding provincial tax authorities require all SR&ED claimants to submit their claim no later than 18 months after the effective fiscal year. For example, for a claimant with a fiscal year ending on December 31, 2018, it is required that the requisite documents are submitted no later than June 30, 2020. With that being said, CRA encourages taxpayers to submit their claims within a six-month time frame post-fiscal year-end, alongside their annual filings, because processing times for SR&ED tend to be much faster. In fact, if submitted within six months post-fiscal year, CRA reports a 60-day turnaround for complete claims. Claimants who submit incomplete claims can expect longer processing times.

Some firms are in need of their SR&ED refund far sooner than the CRA can process their claim, therefore public and private lenders provide financing solutions to claimants. Public lenders tend to shape their financing terms on a firm's short-term and long-term assets, while private lenders will focus primarily on the firm's history with the SR&ED program, as well as the quality and strength of the claim in question. Given that the claim is secured by an anticipated receipt of a tax credit, firms can receive financing for both pre-file and post-file claims.

After submitting a SR&ED claim, the group within the CRA processes the claim on a technical and financial basis. Technical reviewers are primarily concerned with determining whether the project meets the definition of SR&ED, while the financial reviewers focus on the eligibility of associated expenditures expressed in Canadian salaries, subcontractor fees, materials, and overhead. It is possible for a claimant to be reviewed or audited on the basis of technical or financial weaknesses. In either case, the claimant bears the burden of proof and is given an opportunity to defend their claim.

Given the possibility of review or audit by CRA, claimants are strongly encouraged to keep contemporaneous documentation that proves the advancement in a given area of science or technology, as well as associated expenditures. Contemporaneous documentation assumes that eligible SR&ED work is documented at the time the work was conducted. Retroactively documenting eligible SR&ED work is highly discouraged and increases a taxpayer's risk of having a claim reduced or even outright rejected. Examples of contemporaneous documentation include:

- Project planning documents
- Documents on design of experiments
- Experimentation plan
- Design documents and technical drawings
- Project records, laboratory notebooks
- Design, system architecture and source code (software development)
- Records of trial runs
- Project progress reports
- Minutes of project meetings
- Test protocols, data, results, analysis and conclusions
- Final project report or professional publication
- Photographs, videos
- Prototypes, samples
- Scrap, scrap records
- Contracts, lease agreements
- Records of resources allocated to the project, time sheets, activity records, payroll records
- Purchase invoices and proof of payment
- Accounting records

== Administration and Processing Times ==
According to data obtained from the Canada Revenue Agency (CRA) under an Access to Information request covering 2013–2024, SR&ED claims exceeding $10 million were generally accepted at least in part, while smaller claims experienced higher rates of full denial across all processing time categories (within 60 days, 61–180 days, and 181–365 days) Canada Revenue Agency (June 16, 2025). For the period 2013 to 2024. SR&ED claims broken down by claim size (accepted and rejected) based on service level, processed within 60, 180 and 365 days (Access to Information request). Canada Revenue Agency. A-2025-000210.

== Audit Activities and Penalties ==
According to an Access to Information release (CRA file A-2025-000402), the Canada Revenue Agency applied gross negligence penalties to SR&ED claimants in multiple years between 2018 and 2024. The number of penalties ranged from 0 in 2020–2021 to 80 in 2024, with annual penalty amounts between $0 and approximately $5.2 million. Over the same period, between 367 and 1,176 SR&ED claims were fully denied each year, with denied expenditures ranging from roughly $29 million to $76 million.Total amount of gross negligence penalties applied to SR&ED claimants per year, 2018–2024 (Access to Information request). Canada Revenue Agency. June 4, 2025. A-2025-000402.

The CRA recognizes that, particularly among small companies, it is not always easy to maintain documentation. That is why Appendix 2 in the T4088 – Guide to Form T661 gives many examples of evidence that can support the SR&ED work claimed and can be used to ensure that claimants maintain adequate support for their SR&ED. Paper documentation is not the only sort of evidence that can support an SR&ED claim. The RTA does not just look at the physical evidence provided, but also interviews personnel who did the claimed SR&ED work to obtain information about what was done and to help establish the claimant’s business context.

A key precedent was set in the 1997 case of Northwest Hydraulic Consultants Limited v. The Queen, which defined "technological advancement" as an "advancement in general understanding." This ruling established the "Five Questions" test for claim eligibility and underscored the importance of keeping detailed records—including hypotheses, tests, and results—to substantiate and strengthen an SR&ED claim.

Two more important court decisions regarding contemporaneous documentation can be found here.

=== DAZZM Inc. v. The King, 2024 TCC 129 ===
As stated more recently by the Tax Court at paragraph 119 of the decision in DAZZM Inc. v. The King, 2024 TCC 129, although the CRA “would have liked to see contemporaneous time sheets for the work performed, they are not necessarily required for work to be eligible as qualifying SRED…”

=== Abeilles Service de Conditionnement Inc. v. The Queen, 2014 TCC 313 (CanLII) ===
Furthermore, as per the Tax Court of Canada in the decision of Abeilles Service de Conditionnement Inc. v. The Queen, 2014 TCC 313 (CanLII), at paragraph 94, “the existence of contemporaneous documentation, or contemporaneous documents with specific content, is not a condition to the recognition of scientific research or experimental development…

== Tax Earned by Audit from SR&ED ==
A portion of the Canada Revenue Agency’s (CRA) Tax Earned by Audit (TEBA) results come from audits of the federal Scientific Research and Experimental Development (SR&ED) tax incentive program. In response to an Access to Information request, the CRA reported that SR&ED-related TEBA amounted to CAD 155.2 million in 2021–22 (2% of total TEBA), CAD 126.7 million in 2022–23 (1%), CAD 148.9 million in 2023–24 (1%), and CAD 241.3 million in 2024–25 (2%). No TEBA was reported from Clean Economy incentive audits during these years.

Because SR&ED is designed as a tax incentive program intended to encourage private-sector research and development, the inclusion of SR&ED reassessments within TEBA has drawn attention. Critics have noted that using incentive program audits to generate TEBA, a metric tied to organizational performance and executive compensation, may create a potential misalignment between the policy goal of fostering innovation and the administrative focus on tax reassessments.

== See also ==
- Industrial Research Assistance Program
- Western Economic Diversification Canada
