= E-file =

E-file may refer to:

- Canadian efile, an electronic tax filing system of Canada Revenue Agency for professional tax preparers
- E-file, or electronic court filing, a system for automated transmission of legal documents
- e-file.lu, a website for communication between financial institutions and regulators in Luxembourg
- E-FILE, a trademark filed by Sony Corporation in 1986
- IRS e-file, an electronic tax filing system of the United States Internal Revenue Service

== See also ==
- Electronic tax filing (disambiguation)
