= T1 General =

Income tax form used in Canada

The T1 General or T1, officially titled the Income Tax and Benefit Return, is the tax form administered by the Canada Revenue Agency and used by residents of Canada to file personal federal income tax returns. Individuals with tax payable during a calendar year must use the T1 to file their total income from all sources, including employment and self-employment income, interest, dividends, and capital gains, rental income, and so on. Foreign income must also be declared and included in the total income. After applicable deductions and adjustments, the net income and taxable income are determined, from which the federal tax and the provincial or territorial tax are calculated to give the total payable. Subtracting total credits, which include the tax withheld, the filer will either receive a refund or have balance owing, which may be zero.

The T1 and any balance owing for each year are generally due by the end of April of the following year. The T1 filing deadline (April 30) is extended to June 15 where the taxpayer or their spouse earned income from a business at any time during the calendar year. This extension only gives more time for self-employed individuals and their spouses more time to file their returns; any balance owing is still due on April 30 and arrears interest will be charged even if the return is filed before the extended deadline.

There is no requirement to file a T1 return for the year if the tax balance payable for that year is $0 or negative. However, certain government benefits (such as the Canada Groceries and Essentials Benefit and Canada Child Tax Benefit) are only paid if a T1 return is filed for the year.

== See also ==
- Income tax in Canada
