= Income Tax Act (Canada) =

Act of Parliament of Canada imposing income tax

Parliament of Canada
- Long title: An Act respecting income taxes
- Citation: R.S.C. 1985, c. 1 (5th Supp.)
- Enacted: 1917
- Commenced: 1918
- Status: In force

The Canadian Income Tax Act, originally known as The Income War Tax Act, is federal legislation governing income taxes paid in Canada. It was originally introduced as a means to pay for the expenses of World War I. Income taxes are levied by both the federal government and the provincial and territorial governments and is collected by the federal government agency Canada Revenue Agency which administers both the Income Tax Act and the Excise Tax Act. Over 75% of Canadians file income taxes.

== History ==
Unlike the United Kingdom and the United States, Canada had avoided charging an income tax prior to the First World War. The lack of income tax was seen as a key component in Canada's efforts to attract immigrants as Canada offered a lower tax regime compared to almost every other country. Prior to the war, Canadian federal governments relied on tariffs and customs income under the auspices of the National Policy for most of their revenue, and the provincial governments sustained themselves primarily through their management of natural resources (the Prairie Provinces were paid subsidies by the federal government as it retained control of their natural resources). The Liberal Party considered the probable need to introduce an income tax if their negotiation of a free trade agreement with the United States in the early 20th century succeeded, but the Conservatives defeated the Liberals in 1911 by opposing free trade. The Conservative Party opposed income tax as it wanted to attract immigrants primarily from the United Kingdom and the United States, and it wanted to give immigrants an incentive to come to Canada.

Then Canadian Finance Minister Sir Thomas White's new "Income War Tax Act" bill went into Committee of the Whole on July 25, 1917, but faced resistance. Wartime expenses forced the Tories to re-consider their options and in 1918, the wartime government under Sir Robert Borden, imposed an income tax to cover expenses. It was passed under the condition that the government would reconsider its use after the war. Despite the new tax, the Canadian government ran up considerable debts during the war and were unable to forgo income tax revenue after the war ended. With the election of the Liberal government of Prime Minister William Lyon Mackenzie King, much of the National Policy was dismantled and income tax has remained in place ever since.

The law respecting income tax has been modified many times since it was first enacted and it has grown in complication. Tax with-holding was introduced in 1943. In 1948, the Income Tax Act was passed, similar to the Income War Tax Act, but much more comprehensive. There were ten federal tax brackets ranging from 15 to 84 per cent. The number of tax brackets was reduced to three in 1987 and was increased in 2000 to four. There are now five tax brackets. Beginning in 1987, the tax brackets were indexed to increase at 3%.

Capital gains were not taxed until 1971. The income tax itself has become more complex. The 1917 Act was six pages; it is over 1,400 pages today. The original 1917 tax form was 23 lines long; in 2015 it was 328 lines. Originally, the income tax provided two per cent of government revenues; it now raises over half of government revenues.

== Act sections ==
- Part I - Income Tax
- Part II - Special corporate taxes
- Parts III through Part XIV - Various taxes
- Part XV - Administration and Enforcement
- Part XVI - Tax Avoidance
- Part XVII - Interpretation
- Part XVIII - Enhanced International Information Reporting
- Part XIX - Common Reporting Standard
- Part XX - Reporting Rules for Digital Platform Operators

=== Part I - Income tax ===
Income tax is payable on the taxable income of all persons resident in Canada during their taxation year. Income tax is also payable on persons non-resident in Canada who were employed in Canada; ran a business in Canada or sold a taxable Canadian property. Taxable income is the income of the person plus any surtaxes described in Part I, and minus all deductions described in Part I.

The rate of income tax payable by individuals is described in the Regulations of the Act. As of 2025, these are:

Federal income tax rates for 2025
Tax rate	Taxable income threshold
15%	on the portion of taxable income that is $57,375 or less, plus
20.5%	on the portion of taxable income over $57,375 up to $114,750, plus
26%	on the portion of taxable income over $114,750 up to $177,882, plus
29%	on the portion of taxable income over $177,882 up to $253,414, plus
33%	on the portion of taxable income over $253,414

Source: Canada Revenue Agency

Each province and territory also charges an income tax in addition to the federal income tax. The rates are published by the Canada Revenue Agency. These taxes are collected by the federal government on their behalf. Non-residents' tax rate is 25% on the taxable income they earn in Canada.

==== Divisions ====
Section I is divided in the following sections on income tax:

- Division A - Liability of Taxes - who must pay
- Division B - Computation of Income - what is income
- Division C - Computation of Taxable Income - what is taxable income
- Division D - Taxable Income Earned in Canada by Non-Residents
- Division E - Computation of Tax - how much tax is owed according to the rate and circumstances
- Division F - Special Rules Applicable in Certain Circumstances
- Division G - Deferred and Other Special Income Arrangements
- Division H - Exemptions - Non-taxable revenue
- Division I - Returns, Assessments, Payment and Appeals
- Division J - Appeals to the Tax Court of Canada and the Federal Court of Appeal

=== Part II - Special corporate taxes ===
In this section, taxes are imposed on distributions from corporations instead of dividends, such as shares or money. Also, repurchases of equity are taxed.

=== Parts III through Part XIV ===
These are special taxes collected by the federal government:

- Tax on Taxable Dividends Received by Private Corporations
- Tax and Penalties in Respect of Qualified Donees
- Tax on Capital of Financial Institutions
- Tax on Corporations Paying Dividends on Taxable Preferred Shares
- Refundable Tax on Corporations Issuing Qualifying Shares
- Refundable Tax on Corporations in Respect of Scientific Research and Experimental Development Tax Credit
- Tax on Deduction Under Section 66.5
- Tax on Sift Partnerships
- Taxes on Deferred Profit Sharing Plans and Revoked Plans
- Tax in Respect of Advanced Life Deferred Annuity
- Tax in Respect of Certain Royalties, Taxes, Lease Rentals, Etc., Paid to a Government by a Tax Exempt Person
- Tax on Income from Canada of Non-resident Persons
- Additional Tax on Authorized Foreign Banks
- Non-resident Investors in Canadian Mutual Funds
- Additional Tax on Non-resident Corporations

=== Part XV - Administration and Enforcement ===
The act is administered by the Minister along with the Commissioner of Revenue. This is delegated to various officers, clerks and employees. The Minister has the authority to allow extensions to filing periods, waive the filing of documents, though they must be provided at the Minister's request. The Minister, as well as imposing penalties, can also waive or cancel any penalty or interest. The Minister can impose the providing of security on taxes. The Minister can order garnishments, seize goods and property to cover tax owing. The property can be sold in ten days if the tax is not paid and any surplus must be given to the owner of the property seized.

The Governor-In-Counsel makes regulations for the Act. The administration section of the Act also describes how the government can proceed in various cases such as:

- failure to file return
- assessment in lieu of filing a return
- joint liability
- interests on amounts not withheld or deducted
- liability of directors

Canadians need not submit all documents to the Crown when filing a return. Canadians who pay tax must keep records sufficient to allow the determination of the correct amount of tax to be charged. This is for a period of six years after the filing of a return. The Crown can file a search warrant for the documents if there is reasonable grounds to suspect and offence has been committed. A judge can order the delivery of documents also.

The penalties for refusing to file a return is a fine not less than $1,000 and not more than $25,000, and imprisonment for a term not exceeding 12 months. In the case of evasion, the fine can range from 50% to 200% of the evaded amount. A similar fine of 50% to 200% can be imposed on false refunds and credits. There are also fines for filing false tax shelter information, breaches of confidential information, and using a false Social Insurance Number.

The Act also allows the public disclosure of tax credits given, such as for film production or the Clean Economy Tax Credit, and disclose tax information for the purposes of other Acts of Parliament. These include the Canada Pension Plan and the Employment Insurance Act.

=== Part XVI - Tax Avoidance ===
This section is a general rule regarding income tax to prevent the misuse of tax avoidance measures to protect the tax base, while allowing the full amount of tax benefits to Canadians as prescribed by Acts of Parliament.

Transactions to avoid tax are scrutinized. The government must make a fair and reasonable calculation of the tax consequences to that person. 'Avoidance transactions' are those that are determined to be a misuse of:

- this Act,
- the Income Tax Regulations,
- the Income Tax Application Rules,
- a tax treaty, or
- "any other enactment that is relevant in computing tax or any other amount payable by or refundable to a person under this Act or in determining any amount that is relevant for the purposes of that computation;"
- would be a misuse, as a whole

Source: Income Tax Act, section 245 (4)

=== Part XVII - Interpretation ===
This is the glossary of terms used in the Act.

=== Part XVIII - Enhanced International Information Reporting ===
This section describes the obligations of Canadians, Canadian corporations, Canadian financial institutions and the government to share information internationally with the purpose of preventing money laundering and crime. For example, Canadian institutions can offer US accounts, and those would be reported to the US government regulators as appropriate, in terms of transactions. The anti-avoidance provisions apply to international accounts.

=== Part XIX - Common Reporting Standard ===
This part outlines the rules of Canadian institutions in reporting to the federal government. This includes:

- account information
- annuity payments
- interest paid
- proceeds or losses on payments or sales of financial instruments

=== Part XX - Reporting Rules for Digital Platform Operators ===
This applies to corporations acting digitally, such as ride sharing, food and goods delivery, known as the "gig economy". These businesses must provide information about their operations and their sellers who have rented services or transportation through their firm. The rules follow a model rule developed by the OECD called the Model Rules for Reporting by Platform Operators with respect to Sellers in the Sharing and Gig Economy.
