= Surrogatum =

Surrogatum is a thing put in the place of another or a substitute. The Surrogatum Principle pertains to a Canadian income tax principle involving a person who suffers harm caused by another and may seek compensation for (a) loss of income, (b) expenses incurred, (c) property destroyed, or (d) personal injury, as well as punitive damages, under the surrogatum principle, the tax consequences of a damage or settlement payment depend on the tax treatment of the item for which the payment is intended to substitute.

== Surrogatum Principle ==
For taxation in Canada purposes, damages or compensation received, either pursuant to a court judgment or an out-of-court settlement, may be considered as on account of income, capital, or windfall to the recipient. The nature of the injury or harm for which compensation is made generally determines the tax consequences of damages. Under the surrogatum principle, the tax consequences of a damage or settlement payment depend on the tax treatment of the item for which the payment is intended to substitute.

As a judge-made tax principle, the surrogatum principle must relate to tax treatment, not just to the nature of the payment, though in most cases the two will go hand-in-hand. The surrogatum principle should apply to assist in reaching a tax result in accordance with the tax legislation, not to encourage a result of either windfall at one end of the spectrum, or double taxation at the other end. The surrogatum principle should apply to maintain tax neutrality of damages.

If a taxpayer in the course of carrying on a business or earning income from a property receives damages or similar compensation, such as that received as a result of another party's breach of contract or tortious act, the receipt will be either income or capital for income tax purposes. As a general rule, the courts have held that the character of such a receipt will depend on the character of the item or subject matter that the receipt is intended to replace. This judge-made rule is often described as the “surrogatum principle”.

The general principle is that damages in lieu of receipts that would otherwise have been taxable to the taxpayer are taxable as income.

"Where, pursuant to a legal right, a trader receives from another person, compensation for the trader's failure to receive a sum of money which, if it had been received, would have been credited to the amount of profits (if any) arising in any year from the trade carried on by him at the time when the compensation is so received, the compensation is to be treated for income tax purposes in the same way as that sum of money would have been treated if it had been received instead of the compensation. The rule is applicable whatever the source of the legal right of the trader to recover the compensation. It may arise [1] from a primary obligation under a contract, such as a contract of insurance; [2] from a secondary obligation arising out of nonperformance of a contract, such as a right to damages, either liquidated, as under the demurrage clause in a charter party, or unliquidated; [3] from an obligation to pay damages for tort . . . ; [4] from a statutory obligation; [5] or in any other way in which legal obligations arise."

Thus, one must determine whether the receipts, in lieu of which the damages compensate, would have been taxable. Note, however, the characterization of damages as taxable income or non-taxable capital receipts depends upon the nature of the legal right settled and not upon the method used to calculate the award.

=== Case law ===
In the seminal case of London and Thames Haven Oil Wharves, [1967] 2 All E.R. 124, the taxpayer's jetty, which was used in its income-earning operations, was damaged by an oil tanker. In settlement of a tort claim for negligence, the taxpayer received compensation from the owner of the oil tanker, part of which compensated for the loss of the jetty during the period of repair. In holding that the compensation effectively replaced the taxpayer's profits and was therefore taxable as income, Lord Diplock of the House of Lords described the guiding principle as follows:

"I start by formulating what I believe to be the relevant rule. Where, pursuant to a legal right, a trader receives from another person compensation for the trader's failure to receive a sum of money which, if it had been received, would have been credited to the amount of profits (if any) arising in any year from the trade carried on by him at the time when the compensation is so received, the compensation is to be treated for income tax purposes in the same way as that sum of money would have been treated if it had been received instead of the compensation. The rule is applicable whatever the source of the legal right of the trader to recover the compensation. It may arise from a primary obligation under a contract, such as a contract of insurance; from a secondary obligation arising out of non-performance of a contract, such as a right to damages, either liquidated, as under the demurrage clause in a charterparty, or unliquidated; from an obligation to pay damages for tort, as in the present case; from a statutory obligation; or in any other way in which legal obligations arise."

In Commissioners of Inland Revenue v. Fleming & Co. (Machinery), Ltd., (1951), 33 TC 57, the taxpayer received an amount as compensation for the loss of a sales agency agreement with a manufacturer of explosives. The taxpayer had been the sole selling agent pursuant to the agreement. The amount paid to the taxpayer was arrived at by doubling the normal annual commission that it had received pursuant to the agreement. The agency provided between 30% and 45% of the company's total earnings in commissions. In finding that the amount received by the taxpayer was income, Lord Russell formulated the following test, which has been cited in several subsequent Canadian cases and is also described in paragraph 8 of Interpretation Bulletin IT-365R2:

"When the rights and advantages surrendered on cancellation are such as to destroy or materially to cripple the whole structure of the recipient's profit-making apparatus, involving the serious dislocation of the normal commercial organization and resulting perhaps in the cutting down of the staff previously required, the recipient of the compensation may properly affirm that the compensation represents the price paid for the loss or sterilization of a capital asset and is therefore a capital and not a revenue receipt … On the other hand when the benefit surrendered on cancellation does not represent the loss of an enduring asset in circumstances such as those above mentioned — where for an example the structure of the recipient's business is so fashioned as to absorb the shock as one of the normal incidents to be looked for and where it appears that the compensation received is no more than a surrogatum for the future profits surrendered — the compensation received is in use to be treated as a revenue receipt and not a capital receipt."

In contrast, if a contract constitutes a significant part of the company's business structure, compensation paid on the termination of the contract may be on capital account. In Van den Berghs, Ltd. v. Clark, [1935] A.C. 431, the taxpayer was an English company that entered into an agreement with a competing Dutch company which provided that the two companies (which were manufacturers and dealers in margarine) would conduct their businesses in cooperation with one another along certain prescribed lines and that they would share profits or losses. The agreement was to run for thirty years, but differences subsequently arose over the proper distribution of the profits. A settlement was reached under which a lump-sum amount was paid by the Dutch company to the taxpayer and the agreement was terminated. The House of Lords held that the rights of the taxpayer under the agreement constituted a capital asset and the sum paid for their cancellation was a capital receipt.

The case of Parsons-Steiner Ltd. v. Minister of National Revenue, 62 DTC 1148 (Ex. Ct.) was one of the first in Canada to consider the nature of damages received upon the termination of a business contract. The taxpayer received a lump-sum payment upon the cancellation of a sales agency contract under which it sold “Doulton” figurines and china products. This agency, when combined with another with the same company, accounted for 80% of the taxpayer's business and in the last two or three years of the agency one of the products accounted for 55% of the taxpayer's business. The agency relationship had lasted twenty years prior to its termination. Given the length of the agency relationship, its importance to the taxpayer's business operations, and the fact that the taxpayer suffered decreased sales by reason of its inability to replace the agency with an equivalent arrangement, the Exchequer Court found the damages to be capital. The Court held that the damages related to the loss of the taxpayer's interest in the goodwill and business in Doulton products in Canada, which the Court viewed as “a capital asset of an enduring nature”.

In H. A. Roberts Ltd. v. Minister of National Revenue, 69 DTC 5249, the taxpayer carried on a mortgage business in one of its five departments, having obtained two mortgage agencies (as well as a third less significant agency). The mortgage department was operated as a separate division from the taxpayer's other businesses. The net income of the mortgage department ranged from 27% to 51% of the taxpayer's total net income. The two agencies were cancelled and pursuant to the agency agreements the taxpayer received compensation payments. The cancellation of the agencies terminated the taxpayer's mortgage business; the department was closed and the staff was disbanded. In holding that the payments were capital, the Supreme Court of Canada held that the loss of the two agencies represented “the loss of capital assets of an enduring nature the value of which had been built up over the years and that therefore the payments received by this appellant represented capital receipts”.

In The Queen v. Manley, 85 DTC 5150, the taxpayer was hired to find a purchaser for the shares of a family-owned company in exchange for a finder's fee. When he found such a purchaser but was not paid, he sued the former controlling shareholder of the company, who on behalf of the other family shareholders had agreed to pay the finder's fee. The taxpayer was successful in the lawsuit and was awarded damages for the shareholder's breach of warranty of authority. In holding that the damages were income from a business, the Federal Court of Appeal held that they were compensation for the failure to receive the finder's fee, which would have been income from a business because the taxpayer had engaged in an adventure in the nature of trade.

In Canadian National Railway Company v. The Queen, 88 DTC 6340, the taxpayer received an amount upon the termination of a contract for the transportation by road and rail of certain supplies and building materials. Justice Strayer of the Federal Court–Trial Division held that the operations under the contract did not constitute a separate business and that they were not that significant that the termination of the contract destroyed the taxpayer's “profit-making apparatus” or seriously dislocated its “normal commercial organization”. He went on to hold that the purpose of the compensation provision in the contract was to enable the taxpayer to “absorb the shock as one of the normal incidents to be looked for” and that the compensation received was “no more than a surrogatum for the future profits surrendered”. As a result, the payment was income. In contrast, in Pe Ben Industries Company Limited v. The Queen, (88 DTC 6347), heard concurrently with Canadian National Railway, a similar payment was held to be capital. In that case, Justice Strayer concluded that the payment was compensation for the destruction of a distinct part of the taxpayer's business. It had been the first “intermodal” undertaking of the taxpayer, which required it to establish a base of operations at a rail yard solely for that purpose. Justice Strayer held that the termination of the contract put an end to the intermodal operations of the taxpayer, such that the payment was capital. He went on to hold that the taxpayer's rights under the contract constituted “property” and that the termination payment constituted “compensation for property destroyed” and therefore proceeds of disposition received in respect of the property. Since the taxpayer had a nil adjusted cost basis in the contract, the amount of the termination payment was a capital gain.

In T. Eaton Company Limited v. The Queen, 99 DTC 5178, the taxpayer was a tenant under a long-term lease for retail space in a shopping centre. The terms of the lease included a “participation clause” entitling the taxpayer to 20% of the annual net profits of the shopping centre over the duration of the lease. For several years, the taxpayer reported the amounts received under the participation clause as income. In 1989, the landlord offered to buy out the participation clause for $9.25 million. The offer was accepted and the taxpayer reported the $9.25 million amount as proceeds of the disposition of a capital property that had an acquisition cost of nil. Accordingly, the taxpayer reported a capital gain of $9.25 million. The Minister reassessed the taxpayer on the ground that the entire amount constituted income from a business. The Tax Court of Canada agreed with the Minister and characterized the participation clause as part of an ordinary business contract not forming part of the taxpayer's capital structure. However, the Tax Court decision was overturned on appeal to the Federal Court of Appeal. The Federal Court rejected the Minister's position that the participation clause was analogous to an ordinary trade contract. The Federal Court instead characterized the participation clause as an integral part of the lease, which was a capital asset of the taxpayer. The Court held that buy-out of the participation clause had the effect of diminishing the value of this capital asset by $9.25 million. Accordingly, the buy-out amount was on capital account.

Historically, the surrogatum principle has been applied by the courts only in the determination of profit from a business or property under general principles. However, in the case of Tsiaprailis v. The Queen, 2005 DTC 5119, the Supreme Court of Canada applied the principle in its consideration of a more specific statutory provision dealing with amounts received pursuant to a disability insurance plan, namely paragraph 6(1)(f). The case dealt with a lump-sum settlement payment received in respect of a disputed claim under a disability insurance plan. The payment ostensibly represented both past disability benefits accruing to the time of the settlement and the taxpayer's foregone future benefits under the plan. The Court held that the portion of the lump-sum payment reflecting the taxpayer's future benefits was not made pursuant to the insurance plan because there was no obligation to make such a lump-sum payment under the terms of the plan. Therefore, such amount was not taxable under paragraph 6(1)(f). However, turning to the portion of the payment that represented the past benefits under the plan, the Court applied the surrogatum principle in concluding that the portion was taxable under paragraph 6(1)(f) because it was meant to replace amounts that were payable pursuant to the plan.

In Transocean Offshore Limited v. The Queen, 2005 DTC 5201, the non-resident taxpayer received a US$40 million lump-sum payment from a group of Canadian residents who had repudiated a bare boat charter agreement. The Federal Court of Appeal held that withholding tax under paragraph 212(1)(d) applied to the payment because it was made “in lieu of” rent that would have been pursuant to the agreement had it not been repudiated. Although the Court did not apply the judge-made surrogatum principle, simply because the “in lieu of” language of paragraph 212(1)(d) effectively constituted a statutory surrogatum rule, Justice Sharlow described the surrogatum principle as follows:

"… a judge-made rule, sometimes called the “surrogatum principle”, by which the tax treatment of a payment of damages or a settlement payment is considered to be the same as the tax treatment of whatever the payment is intended to replace. Thus, an amount paid as a settlement or as damages is income if it is paid as compensation for lost future rent … It is a capital receipt if it is compensation for a diminution of capital of the recipient: Westfair Foods Ltd v. Minister of National Revenue, [1991] 1 C.T.C. 146, 91 DTC 5073 (F.C.T.D.), affirmed [1991] 2 C.T.C. 343, 91 DTC 5625 (F.C.A.)."

"The surrogatum principle need not be considered in this case because the words “in lieu of” in paragraph 212(1)(d) of the Income Tax Act express a similar idea. The fact finding process that precedes the application of the surrogatum principle is similar to the fact finding process that must be undertaken to determine whether a payment has been made “in lieu of” a specified thing. Here, the fact finding exercise was completed when the Judge determined that the US$40 million payment was made as compensation for lost future rent.

More recently, the surrogatum principle was applied by the Tax Court of Canada in Bourgault Industries Ltd. v. The Queen, 2006 DTC 3420, where a settlement payment arising from an infringement of the taxpayer's patents was held to be on account of lost profits and therefore included in the taxpayer's income. The principle was also applied by the Tax Court in Bueti et al. v. The Queen, 2006 DTC 3047, where the taxpayer as landlord received a lump-sum payment upon the termination of a lease by the tenant. The payment was held to reflect foregone rent under the lease and therefore was included in the taxpayer's income. Both the Bourgault and Bueti decisions were appealed to the Federal Court of Appeal. Those appeals had not been decided at the time of writing."
