= Canada Customs and Revenue Agency =

Canada Customs and Revenue Agency Agence des douanes et du revenu du Canada
- Abbreviation: CCRA (French: ADRC)

Agency overview
- Formed: 1 November 1999
- Preceding agencies: Canada Customs; Revenue Canada
- Dissolved: 12 December 2003
- Superseding agency: Canada Revenue Agency and Canada Border Services Agency

Jurisdictional structure
- Operations jurisdiction: Canada
- Constituting instrument: Canada Customs and Revenue Agency Act

Website
- http://www.ccra-adrc.gc.ca/

Canada Customs and Revenue Agency (CCRA; French: Agence des douanes et du revenu du Canada, ADRC) was a department of the government of Canada and existed from November 1, 1999 until December 12, 2003. It was created from the merging of Revenue Canada with Canada Customs (French: Douanes Canada).

== History ==
During the 1976 Summer Olympics in Montreal, QC, the department was called the Department of National Revenue Customs and Excise.

The CCRA was subsequently split into the Canada Border Services Agency and Canada Revenue Agency in December 2003. Legislation was passed on December 12, 2005 that changed the name from the CCRA to the CRA.
