= Income tax in Canada =

Form of taxation in Canada

Income taxes constitute the majority of the annual revenues of the Government of Canada, and of the governments of the provinces of Canada. In the fiscal year ending March 31, 2025, the federal government collected just over 2.5 times more revenue from personal income taxes than it did from corporate income taxes.

Tax collection agreements enable different governments to levy taxes through a single administration and collection agency. The federal government collects personal income taxes on behalf of all provinces and territories except Quebec. It also collects corporate income taxes on behalf of all provinces and territories except Alberta and Quebec. Canada's federal income tax system is administered by the Canada Revenue Agency (CRA).

Canadian federal income taxes, both personal and corporate income taxes, are levied under the provisions of the Income Tax Act. Provincial and territorial income taxes are levied under various provincial statutes.

The Canadian income tax system is a self-assessment regime. Taxpayers assess their tax liability by filing a return with the CRA by the required filing deadline. CRA will then assess the return based on the return filed and on information it has obtained from employers and financial companies, correcting it for obvious errors. A taxpayer who disagrees with the CRA's assessment of a particular return may appeal the assessment. The appeal process starts when a taxpayer formally objects to the CRA assessment, on prescribed form T400A. The objection must explain, in writing, the reasons for the appeal along with all the related facts. The objection is then reviewed by the appeals branch of the CRA. An appealed assessment may either be confirmed, vacated, or varied by the CRA. If the assessment is confirmed or varied, the taxpayer may appeal the decision to the Tax Court of Canada and then to the Federal Court of Appeal.

== History ==
Unlike the United Kingdom and the United States, Canada had avoided charging an income tax prior to the First World War. The lack of income tax was seen as a key component in Canada's efforts to attract immigrants, as Canada offered a lower tax regime compared to almost every other country. Prior to the war, Canadian federal governments relied on tariffs and customs income under the auspices of the National Policy for most of their revenue, and the provincial governments sustained themselves primarily through their management of natural resources (the Prairie Provinces were paid subsidies by the federal government as Ottawa retained control of their natural resources). The Liberal Party considered the probable need to introduce an income tax if their negotiation of a free trade agreement with the United States in the early 20th century succeeded, but the Conservatives defeated the Liberals in 1911 by opposing free trade. The Conservative Party opposed income tax as it wanted to attract immigrants primarily from the United Kingdom and the United States, and it wanted to give immigrants an incentive to come to Canada.

Then Canadian Finance Minister Sir Thomas White's new "Income War Tax Act" bill went into Committee of the Whole on July 25, 1917, but faced resistance. Wartime expenses forced the Tories to reconsider their options, and in 1918 the wartime government under Sir Robert Borden imposed an income tax to cover expenses. Despite the new tax, the Canadian government ran up considerable debts during the war and was unable to forgo income tax revenue after the war ended. With the election of the Liberal government of Prime Minister William Lyon Mackenzie King, much of the National Policy was dismantled, and income tax has remained in place ever since.

== Constitutional authority ==
The constitutional authority for the federal income tax is found in Section 91, Paragraph 3, of the Constitution Act, 1867, which assigns to the federal Parliament power over "the raising of Money by any Mode or System of Taxation".

The constitutional authority for the various provincial income taxes is found in section 92 paragraph 2 of the Constitution Act, 1867, which assigns to the legislature of each province the power of "Direct Taxation within the Province in order to the raising of a Revenue for Provincial Purposes". The courts have held that "an income tax is the most typical form of direct taxation".

== Personal income taxes ==
Canada levies personal income tax on the worldwide income of individual residents in Canada and on certain types of Canadian-source income earned by non-resident individuals. The Income Tax Act, Part I, subparagraph 2(1), states: "An income tax shall be paid, as required by this Act, on the taxable income for each taxation year of every person resident in Canada at any time in the year."

After the calendar year, Canadian residents file a T1 Tax and Benefit Return for individuals. It is due April 30, or June 15 for self-employed individuals and their spouses, or common-law partners. Any balance owing is due on or before April 30. Outstanding balances remitted after April 30 may be subject to interest charges, regardless of whether the taxpayer's filing due date is April 30 or June 15.

The amount of income tax that an individual must pay is based on the amount of their taxable income (income earned less allowed expenses) for the tax year. Personal income tax may be collected through various means:

1. deduction at source – where income tax is deducted directly from an individual's pay and sent to the CRA.
2. instalment payments – where an individual must pay his or her estimated taxes during the year instead of waiting to settle up at the end of the year.
3. payment on filing – payments made with the income tax return
4. arrears payments – payments made after the return is filed

Employers may also deduct Canada Pension Plan/Quebec Pension Plan (CPP/QPP) contributions, Employment Insurance (EI) and Provincial Parental Insurance (PPIP) premiums from their employees' gross pay. Employers then send these deductions to the taxing authority.

Individuals who have overpaid taxes or had excess tax deducted at source will receive a refund from the CRA upon filing their annual tax return.

=== Basic calculation ===
An individual taxpayer must report his or her total income for the year. Certain deductions are allowed in determining "net income", such as deductions for contributions to Registered Retirement Savings Plans, union and professional dues, child care expenses, and business investment losses. Net income is used for determining several income-tested social benefits provided by the federal and provincial/territorial governments. Further deductions are allowed in determining "taxable income", such as capital losses, half of capital gains included in income, and a special deduction for residents of northern Canada. Deductions permit certain amounts to be excluded from taxation altogether.

"Tax payable before credits" is determined using five tax brackets and tax rates. Non-refundable tax credits are then deducted from tax payable before credits for various items such as a basic personal amount, dependents, Canada/Quebec Pension Plan contributions, Employment Insurance premiums, disabilities, tuition and education and medical expenses. These credits are calculated by multiplying the credit amount (e.g., the basic personal amount of $14,538–$16,129 in 2025) by the lowest tax rate. This mechanism is designed to provide equal benefit to taxpayers regardless of the rate at which they pay tax.

A non-refundable tax credit for charitable donations is calculated at the lowest tax rate for the first $200 in a year, and at the second-highest or highest tax rate for the portion in excess of $200. Donations can result in a reduction in taxes of between 40 and 60% of the donation depending on the province of the taxpayer and type of property donated. This tax credit is designed to encourage more generous charitable giving.

Certain other tax credits are provided to recognize tax already paid so that the income is not taxed twice:

- the dividend tax credit provides recognition of tax paid at the corporate level on income distributed from a Canadian corporation to individual shareholders; and
- the foreign tax credit recognizes tax paid to a foreign government on income earned in a foreign country.

=== Provincial and territorial personal income taxes ===
Provinces and territories that have entered into tax collection agreements with the federal government for collection of personal income taxes ("agreeing provinces", i.e., all provinces and territories except Quebec) must use the federal definition of "taxable income" as the basis for their taxation. This means that they are not allowed to provide or ignore federal deductions in calculating the income on which provincial tax is based.

Provincial and territorial governments provide both nonrefundable and refundable tax credits to taxpayers for certain expenses. They may also apply surtaxes and offer low-income tax reductions.

The Canada Revenue Agency collects personal income taxes for agreeing provinces/territories and remits the revenues to the respective governments. The provincial/territorial tax forms are distributed with the federal tax forms, and the taxpayer need make only one payment—to CRA—for both types of tax. Similarly, if a taxpayer is to receive a refund, he or she receives one cheque or bank transfer for the combined federal and provincial/territorial tax refund. Information on provincial rates can be found on the Canada Revenue Agency's website.

Individuals in Canada generally pay income taxes on employment and investment income to the province in which they reside on December 31 of the tax year. This ensures that taxpayers who live in one province and work in another, or who move from one province to another, in most cases only have to file a tax return for one province. Individuals with business income have to pay tax on the business income to the province in which it was earned. If it was earned in more than one province, it is allocated based on a formula in the Income Tax Regulations. In addition to the income tax levied as a percentage of taxable income, one province, Ontario, levies a surtax as a percentage of tax over a certain threshold. Prior to the 2024 tax season, the province of Prince Edward Island additionally charged a surtax.

2026 provincial and territorial income tax rates
Province/Territory	Tax brackets (income categories and tax rates)								Surtax (% of tax)	
Newfoundland and Labrador	$0 – $44,678	$44,678 – $89,354	$89,354 – $159,528	$159,528 – $223,340	$223,340 – $285,319	$285,319 – $570,638	$570,638 – $1,141,275	over $1,141,275		
Newfoundland and Labrador	8.7%	14.5%	15.8%	17.8%	19.8%	20.8%	21.3%	21.8%		
Prince Edward; Island	$0 – $33,928	$33,928 – $65,820	$65,820 – $106,890	$106,890 – $142,520	$142,520 – $200,000	over $200,000				
Prince Edward; Island	9.5%	13.47%	16.6%	17.62%	19%	20%				
Nova Scotia	$0 – $30,995	$30,995 – $61,991	$61,991 – $97,417	$97,417 – $157,124	over $157,124					
Nova Scotia	8.79%	14.95%	16.67%	17.5%	21%					
New Brunswick	$0 – $52,333	$52,333 – $104,666	$104,666 – $193,861	over $193,861						
New Brunswick	9.4%	14%	16%	19.5%						
Quebec	$0 – $54,345	$54,345 – $108,680	$108,680 – $132,245	over $132,245						
Quebec	14%	19%	24%	25.75%						
Ontario	$0 – $53,891	$53,891 – $107,785	$107,785 – $150,000	$150,000 – $220,000	over $220,000				$5,818 – $7,446	over $7,446
Ontario	5.05%	9.15%	11.16%	12.16%	13.16%				20%	56%
Manitoba	$0 – $47,564	$47,564 – $101,200	over $101,200							
Manitoba	10.8%	12.75%	17.4%							
Saskatchewan	$0 – $54,532	$54,532 – $155,805	over $155,805							
Saskatchewan	10.5%	12.5%	14.5%							
Alberta	$0 – $61,200	$61,200 – $154,259	$154,259 – $185,111	$185,111 – $246,813	$246,813 – $370,220	over $370,220				
Alberta	8%	10%	12%	13%	14%	15%				
British Columbia	$0 – $50,363	$50,363 – $100,728	$100,728 – $115,648	$115,648 – $140,430	$140,430 – $190,405	$190,405 – $265,545	over $265,545			
British Columbia	5.6%	7.7%	10.5%	12.29%	14.7%	16.8%	20.5%			
Yukon	$0 – $58,523	$58,523 – $117,045	$117,045 – $181,440	$181,440 – $500,000	over $500,000					
Yukon	6.4%	9%	10.9%	12.8%	15%					
Northwest; Territories	$0 – $53,003	$53,003 – $106,009	$106,009 – $172,346	over $172,346						
Northwest; Territories	5.9%	8.6%	12.2%	14.05%						
Nunavut	$0 – $55,801	$55,801 – $111,602	$111,602 – $181,439	over $181,439						
Nunavut	4%	7%	9%	11.5%						

==== Quebec ====
Quebec administers its own personal income tax system, and therefore is free to determine its own definition of taxable income. To maintain simplicity for taxpayers, however, Quebec parallels many aspects of and uses many definitions found in the federal tax system.

Quebec chooses to receive part of its health and social transfers in tax points instead of cash. To compensate for this, federal personal income taxes on income earned in Quebec are reduced by 16.5% of federal tax. This is referred to as the Quebec Abatement.

=== Federal marginal tax rates ===
The following historical personal federal marginal tax rates of the Government of Canada come from the website of the Canada Revenue Agency. They do not include applicable provincial income taxes. Data on marginal tax rates from 1998 to 2018 are publicly available. Data on basic personal amounts (personal exemption taxed at 0%) can be found on a year by year basis is also available. Their values are contained on line 300 of either the document "Schedule 1 - Federal Tax", or "General Income Tax and Benefit Guide", of each year by year General Income Tax and Benefit Package listed. The personal exemption is listed as it always applies. Additional deductions may be applied depending on eligibility, see. The most common additional deductions are Canada Pension Plan (CPP), Employment Insurance (EI) and employment credit. Exempt amounts are calculated, multiplied by the lowest tax rate and the result is tax credits that reduce the total amount of tax owed.

Year	Personal Amount	Canadian Federal Marginal Tax Rates of Taxable Income				
2026	$16,452	$0 – $58,523	$58,523 – $117,045	$117,045 – $181,440	$181,440 – $258,482	over $258,482
2026	0%	14%	20.5%	26%	29%	33%
2025	$16,129	$0 – $57,375	$57,375 – $114,750	$114,750 – $177,882	$177,882 – $253,414	over $253,414
2025	0%	14.5%	20.5%	26%	29%	33%
2024	$15,705	$0 – $55,867	$55,867 – $111,733	$111,733 – $173,205	$173,205 – $246,752	over $246,752
2024	0%	15%	20.5%	26%	29%	33%
2023	$15,000	$0 – $53,359	$53,359 – $106,717	$106,717 – $165,430	$165,430 – $235,675	over $235,675
2023	0%	15%	20.5%	26%	29%	33%
2022	$14,398	$0 – $50,197	$50,197 – $100,392	$100,392 – $155,625	$155,625 – $221,708	over $221,708
2022	0%	15%	20.5%	26%	29%	33%
2021	$13,808	$0 – $49,020	$49,020 – $98,040	$98,040 – $151,978	$151,978 – $216,511	over $216,511
2021	0%	15%	20.5%	26%	29%	33%
2020	$13,229	$0 – $48,535	$48,535 – $97,069	$97,069 – $150,473	$150,473 – $214,368	over $214,368
2020	0%	15%	20.5%	26%	29%	33%
2019	$12,069	$0 – $47,630	$47,630 – $95,259	$95,259 – $147,667	$147,667 – $210,371	over $210,371
2019	0%	15%	20.5%	26%	29%	33%
2018	$11,809	$0 – $46,605	$46,605 – $93,208	$93,208 – $144,489	$144,489 – $205,842	over $205,842
2018	0%	15%	20.5%	26%	29%	33%
2017	$11,635	$0 – $45,916	$45,916 – $91,831	$91,831 – $142,353	$142,353 – $202,800	over $202,800
2017	0%	15%	20.5%	26%	29%	33%
2016	$11,474	$0 – $45,282	$45,282 – $90,563	$90,563 – $140,388	$140,388 – $200,000	over $200,000
2016	0%	15%	20.5%	26%	29%	33%
2015	$11,327	$0 – $44,701	$44,701 – $89,401	$89,401 – $138,586	over $138,586	
2015	0%	15%	22%	26%	29%	
2014	$11,138	$0 – $43,953	$43,954 – $87,907	$87,908 – $136,270	over $136,270	
2014	0%	15%	22%	26%	29%	
2013	$11,038	$0 – $43,561	$43,562 – $87,123	$87,124 – $135,054	over $135,055	
2013	0%	15%	22%	26%	29%	
2012	$10,822	$0 – $42,706	$42,707 – $85,413	$85,414 – $132,405	over $132,406	
2012	0%	15%	22%	26%	29%	
2011	$10,527	$0 – $41,544	$41,544 – $83,088	$83,088 – $128,800	over $128,800	
2011	0%	15%	22%	26%	29%	
2010	$10,382	$0 – $40,970	$40,971 – $81,941	$81,942 – $127,021	over $127,021	
2010	0%	15%	22%	26%	29%	
2009	$10,320	$0 – $40,726	$40,727 – $81,452	$81,453 – $126,264	over $126,264	
2009	0%	15%	22%	26%	29%	
2008	$9,600	$0 – $37,885	$37,886 – $75,769	$75,770 – $123,184	over $123,184	
2008	0%	15%	22%	26%	29%	
2007	$9,600	$0 – $37,178	$37,178 – $74,357	$74,357 – $120,887	over $120,887	
2007	0%	15%	22%	26%	29%	
2006	$8,839	$0 – $36,378	$36,378 – $72,756	$72,756 – $118,285	over $118,285	
2006	0%	15.25%	22%	26%	29%	
2005	$8,648	$0 – $35,595	$35,595 – $71,190	$71,190 – $115,739	over $115,739	
2005	0%	15%	22%	26%	29%	
2004	$8,012	$0 – $35,000	$35,000 – $70,000	$70,000 – $113,804	over $113,804	
2004	0%	16%	22%	26%	29%	
2003	$7,756	$0 – $32,183	$32,183 – $64,368	$64,368 – $104,648	over $104,648	
2003	0%	16%	22%	26%	29%	
2002	$7,634	$0 – $31,677	$31,677 – $63,354	$63,354 – $103,000	over $103,000	
2002	0%	16%	22%	26%	29%	
2001	$7,412	$0 – $30,754	$30,754 – $61,509	$61,509 – $100,000	over $100,000	
2001	0%	16%	22%	26%	29%	
2000	$7,231	$0 – $30,004	$30,004 – $60,009	over $60,009		
2000	0%	17%	25%	29%		
1999	$6,794	$0 – $29,590	$29,590 – $59,180	over $59,180		
1999	0%	17%	26%	29%		
1998	$6,456	$0 – $29,590	$29,590 – $59,180	over $59,180		
1998	0%	17%	26%	29%		

The rates above do not account for federal surtax nor surtax reduction prior to 2001.

=== Income not taxed ===
The following types of income are not taxed in Canada (this list is not exhaustive):

- gifts and inheritances;
- death benefits paid from a life insurance policy;
- lottery winnings;
- winnings from betting or gambling for simple recreation or enjoyment;
- strike pay;
- income earned within a Tax-Free Savings Account;
- compensation paid by a province or territory to a victim of a criminal act or a motor vehicle accident; (Note: Quebec changed its rules in 2004 and, legally, this may be taxed or may not – Courts have yet to rule.)
- certain civil and military service pensions;
- income from certain international organizations of which Canada is a member, such as the United Nations and its agencies;
- war disability pensions;
- RCMP pensions or compensation paid in respect of injury, disability, or death;
- income of First Nations, if situated on a reserve;
- capital gain on the sale of a taxpayer's principal residence;
- provincial child tax credits or benefits and Québec family allowances;
- Working income tax benefit;
- the Goods and Services Tax or Harmonized Sales Tax credit (GST/HST credit), Quebec Sales Tax credit or Saskatchewan Sales Tax Credit;
- the Canada Child Benefit.

The method by which these forms of income are not taxed can vary significantly, which may have tax and other implications. Some forms of income are not declared, while others are declared and then immediately deducted in full. Some of the tax exemptions are based on statutory enactments, whereas others (like the non-taxability of lottery winnings) are based on the non-statutory common law concept of "income". In certain cases, the deduction may require offsetting income, while in other cases the deduction may be used without corresponding income. Income which is declared and then deducted, for example, may create room for future Registered Retirement Savings Plan (RRSP) deductions. But the RRSP contribution room may be reduced with a pension adjustment if the taxpayer is part of another plan, reducing the ability to use RRSP contributions as a deduction.

Deductions which are not directly linked to non-taxable income exist, which reduce overall taxable income. A key example is RRSP contributions, a form of tax-deferred savings account (income tax is paid only at withdrawal, and no interim tax is payable on account earnings).

== Corporate income taxes ==
Corporate taxes include taxes on corporate income in Canada and other taxes and levies paid by corporations to the various levels of government in Canada. These include capital and insurance premium taxes; payroll levies (e.g., employment insurance, Canada Pension Plan, Quebec Pension Plan and Workers' Compensation); property taxes; and indirect taxes, such as goods and services tax (GST), and sales and excise taxes, levied on business inputs.

Corporations are subject to tax in Canada on their worldwide income if they are resident in Canada for Canadian tax purposes. Corporations not resident in Canada are subject to Canadian tax on certain types of Canadian source income (Section 115 of the Canadian Income Tax Act).

Effective January 1, 2012, the net federal corporate income tax rate in Canada was 15%, or 11% for corporations able to claim the small business deduction; in addition, corporations are subject to provincial income tax that may range from zero to 16%, depending on the province and the size of the business.

=== Corporation types ===
The taxes payable by a Canadian resident corporation depend on the type of corporation that it is:

- A Canadian-controlled private corporation, which is defined as a corporation that is:
  - resident in Canada and either incorporated in Canada or resident in Canada from June 18, 1971, to the end of the taxation year;
  - not controlled directly or indirectly by one or more non-resident persons;
  - not controlled directly or indirectly by one or more public corporations (other than a prescribed venture capital corporation, as defined in Regulation 6700);
  - not controlled by a Canadian resident corporation that lists its shares on a prescribed stock exchange outside of Canada;
  - not controlled directly or indirectly by any combination of persons described in the three preceding conditions; if all of its shares that are owned by a non-resident person, by a public corporation (other than a prescribed venture capital corporation), or by a corporation with a class of shares listed on a prescribed stock exchange, were owned by one person, that person would not own sufficient shares to control the corporation; and
  - no class of its shares of capital stock is listed on a prescribed stock exchange.
- A private corporation, which is defined as a corporation that is:
  - resident in Canada;
  - not a public corporation;
  - not controlled by one or more public corporations (other than a prescribed venture capital corporation, as defined in Regulation 6700);
  - not controlled by one or more prescribed federal Crown corporations (as defined in Regulation 7100); and
  - not controlled by any combination of corporations described in the two preceding conditions.
- A public corporation, defined as a corporation that is resident in Canada and meets either of the following requirements at the end of the taxation year:
  - it has a class of shares listed on a prescribed Canadian stock exchange; or
  - it has elected, or the Minister of National Revenue has designated it, to be a public corporation and the corporation has complied with prescribed conditions under Regulation 4800(1) on the number of its shareholders, the dispersing of the ownership of its shares, the public trading of its shares, and the size of the corporation.

If a public corporation has complied with certain prescribed conditions under Regulation 4800(2), it can elect, or the Minister of National Revenue can designate it, not to be a public corporation. Other types of Canadian resident corporations include Canadian subsidiaries of public corporations (which do not qualify as public corporations), general insurers and Crown corporations.

=== Provincial/territorial corporate income taxes ===
Corporate income taxes are collected by the CRA for all provinces and territories except Quebec and Alberta. Provinces and territories subject to a tax collection agreement must use the federal definition of "taxable income", i.e., they are not allowed to provide deductions in calculating taxable income. These provinces and territories may provide tax credits to companies, often in order to provide incentives for certain activities such as mining exploration, film production, and job creation.

Quebec and Alberta collect their own corporate income taxes, and therefore may develop their own definitions of taxable income. In practice, these provinces rarely deviate from the federal tax base in order to maintain simplicity for taxpayers.

Ontario negotiated a tax collection agreement with the federal government under which its corporate income taxes would be collected on its behalf by the CRA starting in 2009.

== Integration of corporate and personal income taxes ==
In Canada, corporate income is subject to corporate income tax and, on distribution as dividends to individuals, personal income tax. To avoid this "double taxation" of the same income, the personal income tax system, through the gross-up and dividend tax credit (DTC) mechanisms, provides recognition for corporate taxes, based notional federal-provincial corporate tax rates, to taxable individuals resident in Canada who receive dividends from Canadian corporations.

A dividend from a small business ("Canadian-controlled private corporation") is grossed-up by 17%, meaning that the shareholder includes 117% of the dividend amount in income, to reflect the pre-tax income of the small business out of which it has paid the dividend. This income is taxed at the shareholder's personal income tax rate, but a part of the tax is offset by a 10.5217% dividend tax credit (for 2017) to reflect the federal tax paid at the corporate level. There are also provincial dividend tax credits at different rates in different provinces.

For dividends from other Canadian corporations, i.e., "eligible dividends", the gross-up is 38% and the dividend tax credit is 15.0198% (for 2017), reflecting the higher corporate income tax rate paid by larger corporations. Provincial and territorial governments also provide dividend tax credits to reflect provincial/territorial corporate income tax.

== International comparison (personal income tax) ==
Comparison of total taxes paid by a household earning the country's average wage (as of 2005), including personal income tax, employee and employer social security contributions, payroll taxes and cash benefits. It does NOT include local income tax levied by states and cities. (source: Organisation for Economic Co-operation and Development).
Country	Single no children	Married 2 children	Country	Single no children	Married 2 children
Australia	28.3%	16.0%	Korea	17.3%	15.2%
Austria	47.4%	35.5%	Luxembourg	35.3%	12.2%
Belgium	55.4%	40.3%	Mexico	18.2%	18.2%
Canada	31.6%	21.5%	Netherlands	38.6%	29.1%
Czech Republic	43.8%	27.1%	New Zealand	20.5%	14.5%
Denmark	41.4%	29.6%	Norway	37.3%	29.6%
Finland	44.6%	38.4%	Poland	43.6%	42.1%
France	50.1%	41.7%	Portugal	36.2%	26.6%
Germany	51.8%	35.7%	Slovakia	38.3%	23.2%
Greece	38.8%	39.2%	Spain	39.0%	33.4%
Hungary	50.5%	39.9%	Sweden	47.9%	42.4%
Iceland	29.0%	11.0%	Switzerland	29.5%	18.6%
Ireland	25.7%	8.1%	Turkey	42.7%	42.7%
Isle of Man	10%	10%	United Kingdom	33.5%	27.1%
Italy	45.4%	35.2%	United States	29.1%	11.9%
Japan	27.7%	24.9%
_{Source: OECD, 2005 data}

== See also ==
- Taxation in Canada
- Canadian federal budget
- Harmonized sales tax
