= NETFILE =

Transmission service for income tax return in Canada

NETFILE (founded 2001) is a transmission service which enables qualified Canadians to submit their personal income tax return to the Canada Revenue Agency using the Internet. A NETFILE-certified product is required to be used to prepare tax returns prior to being filed through NETFILE. To qualify as a tax filing, the software or web application produces a .tax file which has to be uploaded to the CRA on its own by the user.

The CRA estimates that NETFILE filed 26 percent of the entire tax returns for 2014. To NETFILE taxes, a certified tax program is needed for users and can be found on the CRA website.

== Advantages ==
According to the CRA website, direct filing via NETFILE-certified tax software offers immediate confirmation upon receiving of the tax return and improved precision. Unless they are requested for later, receipts are not required to be handed in. With NETFILE, refunds are processed faster, and with a direct deposit, reimbursements can be received in two weeks.

== See also ==
- Canadian efile, a comparable service that professional tax preparers use
