= Canada Revenue Agency =

Canadian tax collection agency

Coordinates: 45°25′35″N 75°41′41″W

- Agence du revenu du Canada

Agency overview
- Formed: November 1999 formed by Canada Revenue Agency Act, 1999
- Preceding agency: Canada Customs and Revenue Agency
- Type: Revenue service
- Jurisdiction: Canada
- Headquarters: Connaught Building 555 Mackenzie Avenue Ottawa, Ontario
- Employees: 59,155 (2024)
- Annual budget: $5.1 billion (2018–19)
- Minister responsible: François-Philippe Champagne, Minister of National Revenue
- Agency executives: Heather Evans, Commissioner; Jean-François Fortin, Deputy Commissioner
- Child agency: Office of the Taxpayers' Ombudsperson
- Key document: Canada Revenue Agency Act
- Website: canada.ca/revenue-agency

The Canada Revenue Agency (CRA; French: Agence du revenu du Canada; ARC) is the revenue service of the Canadian federal government, and most provincial and territorial governments. The CRA collects taxes, administers tax law and policy, and delivers benefit programs and tax credits. Legislation administered by the CRA includes the Income Tax Act, parts of the Excise Tax Act, and parts of laws relating to the Canada Pension Plan, employment insurance (EI), tariffs and duties. The agency also oversees the registration of charities in Canada, and enforces much of the country's tax laws.

From 1867 to 1999, tax services and programs were administered by the Department of National Revenue, otherwise known as Revenue Canada. In 1999, Revenue Canada was reorganized into the Canada Customs and Revenue Agency (CCRA). In 2003, the Canada Border Services Agency (CBSA) was created out of the CCRA, leading to customs being dropped from the agency's mandate and the agency's current name.

The CRA is the largest organization in the Canadian federal public service by number of personnel, employing 54,933 people and has an operating budget of $5.1 billion as of the 2018–19 fiscal year. The agency's headquarters are based in Ottawa, itself divided into five program branches, which directly support the CRA's core responsibilities, and seven corporate branches, which deliver internal services within the organization. The CRA also has operations throughout the rest of Canada, including 4 Tax Centres (TCs), 3 National Verifications and Collections Centres (NVCCs), and 25 Tax Services Offices (TSOs), organized into four regions: Atlantic, Ontario, Quebec, and Western.

During the 2017 tax year, the CRA collected approximately $430 billion in revenue on behalf of federal and provincial governments, and administered nearly $34 billion in benefits to Canadians.

The CRA is responsible to Parliament through the minister of national revenue (currently François-Philippe Champagne since May 2025). The day-to-day operations of the Agency are overseen by the Commissioner of Revenue (Heather Evans since June 2026).

== History ==
Prior to Confederation, the collection of taxes and customs duties was the responsibility of the Department of Customs in each of the British North American colonies. In 1867, Parliament enacted legislation which established two separate departments, Inland Revenue, and Customs. Until end of World War I, the majority of federal revenue came from customs and excise duties, but as the war effort placed increasing pressure on government finances, the Borden government introduced a personal income tax in 1917. While intended to be a temporary measure at first, the federal government has since continued to levy personal income taxes, and are now the largest source of revenue for the federal government. Both Inland Revenue and Customs were eventually merged into a single department, Customs and Excise, between 1918 and 1927.

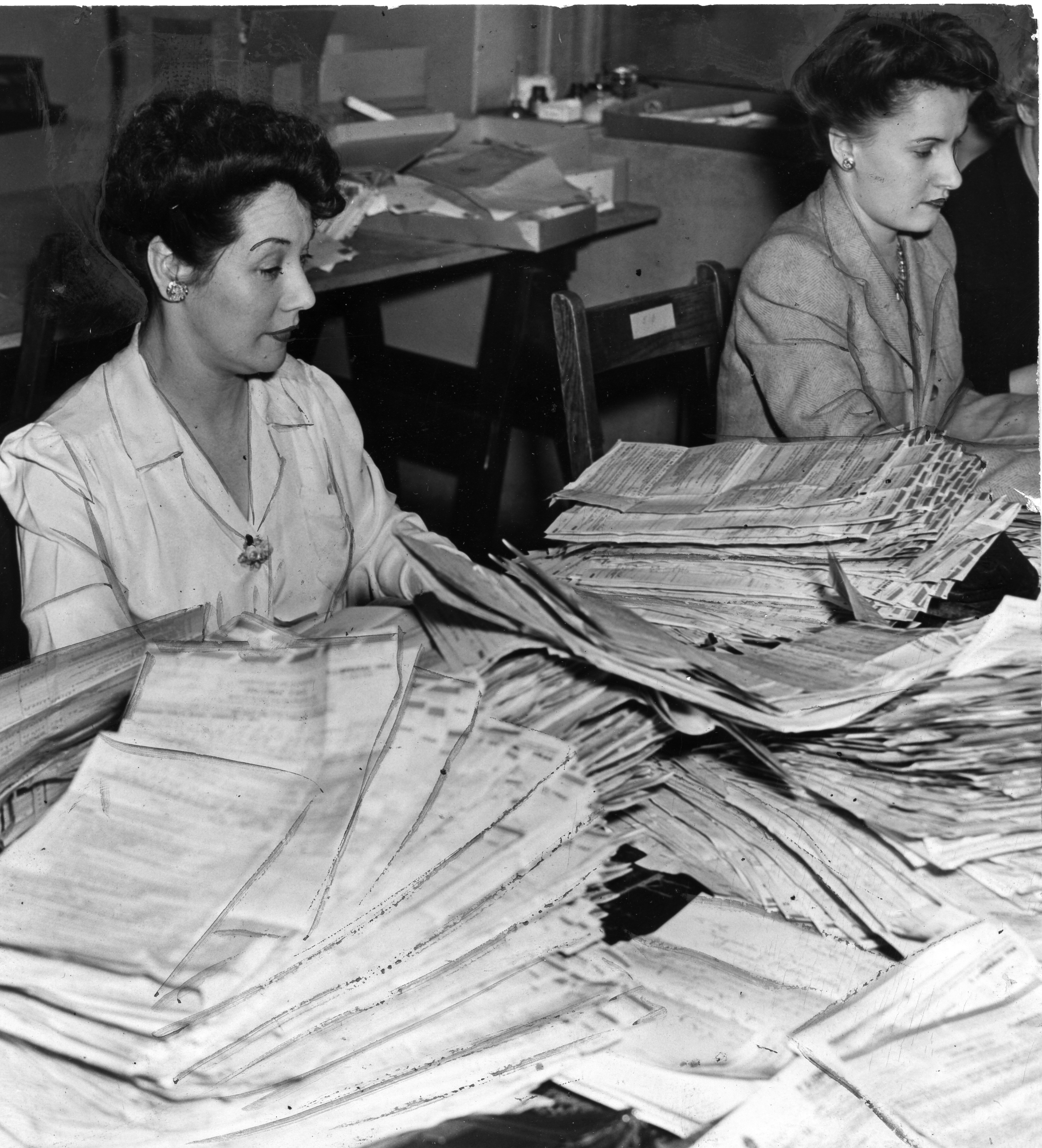
Department of National Revenue employees sorting through tax returns, 1945

In 1927, the Department of National Revenue Act was enacted by Parliament, which changed the name of the department from Customs and Excise to National Revenue, while retaining its earlier mandate. The Department of National Revenue would gain increasing responsibility as new social programs, such as the Canada Pension Plan, and new streams of revenue, such as the Goods and Services Tax (GST) were gradually introduced over the latter half of the 20th century. In 1993, EFILE was first made available to Canadian taxpayers wishing to submit their taxes electronically.

In 1999, the Chrétien government introduced legislation that would transform Revenue Canada from a department to a new agency, the Canada Customs and Revenue Agency. This change was intended to reduce duplication in tax administration, streamline services to Canadians, and provide the tax administration with more flexibility in corporate planning, and in forming relationships with provincial, territorial, and Indigenous governments. The CCRA was given a broad mandate that covered taxation, customs, and border protection. This arrangement only lasted until December 2003, when the Canada Border Services Agency was spun off from the CCRA due to issues relating to interdepartmental collaboration between the CCRA, Citizenship and Immigration Canada and the Canadian Food Inspection Agency on border protection and immigration enforcement.

Following the CBSA spin-off, the CCRA was rebranded as the Canada Revenue Agency, with its strategic direction pivoting towards enforcing compliance with Canada's tax laws and delivering benefits to Canadians. Due to the COVID-19 pandemic, the CRA joined several other government departments in transitioning to temporary remote work arrangements. The CRA also extended deadlines for filing returns and payments for the 2019 tax year. The agency was also tasked with delivering emergency financial benefits to Canadians on behalf of the federal government, processing millions of applications through its IT systems.

== Structure ==
=== Leadership ===
The CRA is led by the Minister of National Revenue and the Commissioner of Revenue, who functions as the Agency's chief executive officer (CEO).

==== Minister of National Revenue ====
The Minister is accountable to Parliament and Cabinet for the CRA's operations, and in matters pertaining to tax and benefit administration in Canada. The current Minister is François-Philippe Champagne, who was appointed on May 13, 2025.

==== Commissioner and Chief Executive Officer ====
The Commissioner is the CRA's CEO. The Commissioner manages the day-to-day operations of the Agency, and advises the Minister on the duties and functions of the CRA as prescribed by legislation. The current Commissioner is Heather Evans, who was appointed to the position on June 23, 2026.

The Commissioner is supported by the Deputy Commissioner, who fulfils specific duties and assignments provided to them by the Commissioner, and acts for the Commissioner in the event of absence or incapacity. The current Deputy Commissioner is Jean-François Fortin, who was appointed to the position on May 6, 2024.

List of CRA Commissioners and date of appointment
Name	Date appointed
Heather Evans	June 23, 2026
Jean-François Fortin	March 31, 2026
Bob Hamilton	August 1, 2016
Andrew Treusch	January 14, 2013
Linda Lizotte-MacPherson	October 13, 2009
William Baker	April 2, 2007
Michael Dorais	December 20, 2004
Alan Nymark	June 2, 2003
Robert A. Wright	November 1, 1999

==== Board of Management ====
The Minister and Commissioner are supported by the Board of Management. The Board of Management consists of 15 members appointed by the Governor in Council, of which 11 are appointed by the provinces and territories, 2 by the federal government, with the remaining seat filled by the Commissioner of Revenue, who is an ex-officio member of the Board. Board members are typically appointed for a term of three years. The Board oversees the development the CRA's Corporate Business Plan each year, which sets out objectives, performance expectations, and financial allocations within the Agency.

The Board of Management is divided into four committees, Audit, Governance and Social Responsibility, Human Resources, and Resources, and one subcommittee, Service Transformation. These committees allow for a detailed review of items brought before the board, and establish work plans for their respective activities each year.

The Board of Management is not directly involved with the CRA's business operations. As such, it cannot enforce or interpret legislation on behalf of the Agency, and does not have access to taxpayer information.

==== Advisory committees ====
The CRA maintains four advisory committees to assist it in operational planning and decision-making as it relates to different sectors or issues. Advisory committees consist of tax professionals, lawyers, accountants, and community leaders that help the agency improve its service delivery within a specific area. The current advisory committees are as follows:

- Advisory Committee on the Charitable Sector
- Audit File Resolution Committee
- Disability Advisory Committee
- Offshore Compliance Advisory Committee

=== Headquarters ===
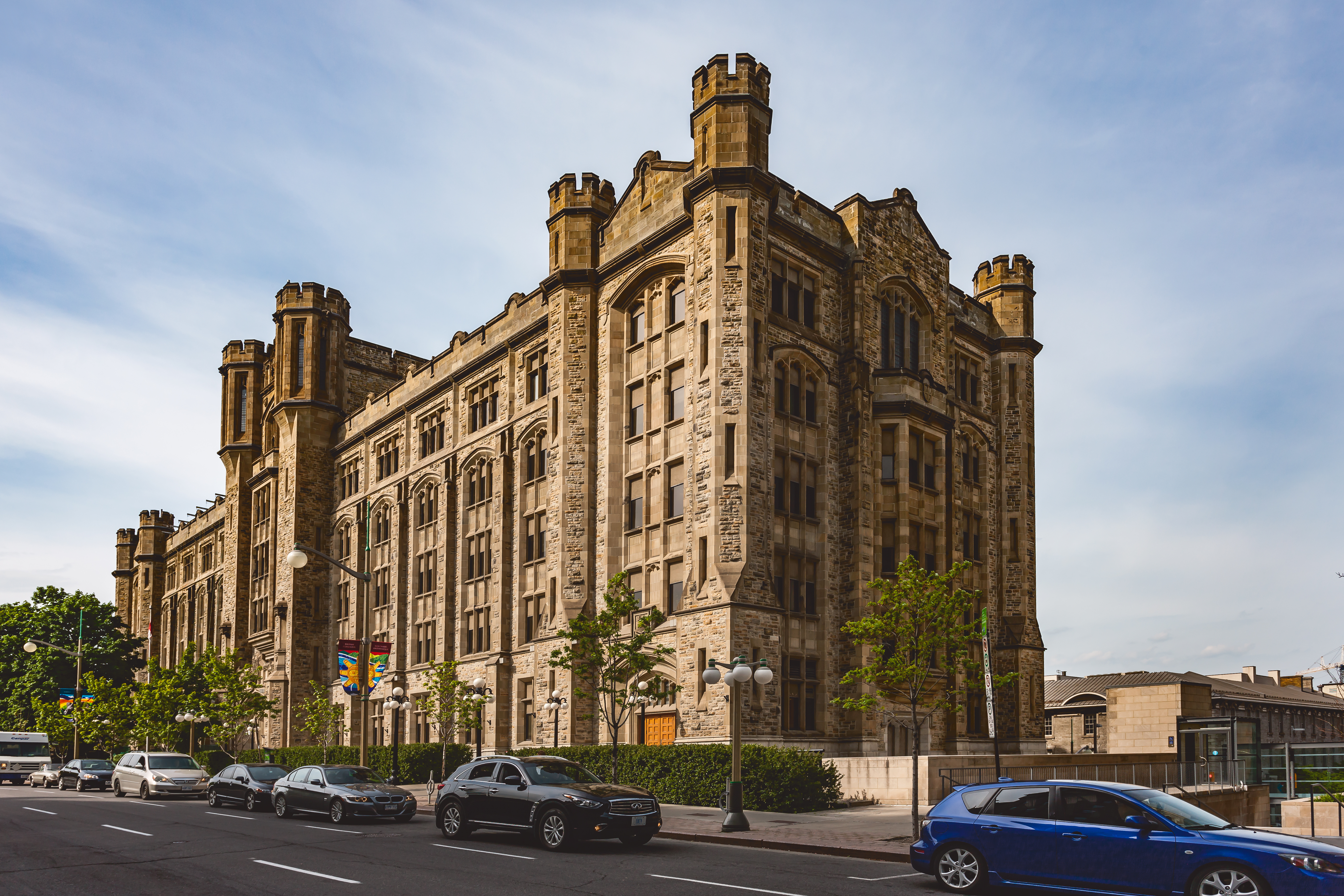
Connaught Building, headquarters of the Canada Revenue Agency

The CRA's headquarters are located in Ottawa, and is responsible for several agency-wide functions, including ministerial reporting, corporate planning, human resources, information technology, communications, and interpreting tax legislation. Headquarters is divided into five program branches, which help deliver the Agency's core mandate around tax and benefits administration, and seven corporate branches, which deliver services that support the day-to-day operations of the CRA.

List of CRA branches
Program	Corporate
Appeals; Assessment, Benefit, and Service; Collections and Verification; Compliance Programs; Legislative Policy and Regulatory Affairs	Audit, Evaluation, and Risk; Finance and Administration; Human Resources; Information Technology; Public Affairs; Legal Services; Service, Innovation, and Integration

=== Regions ===
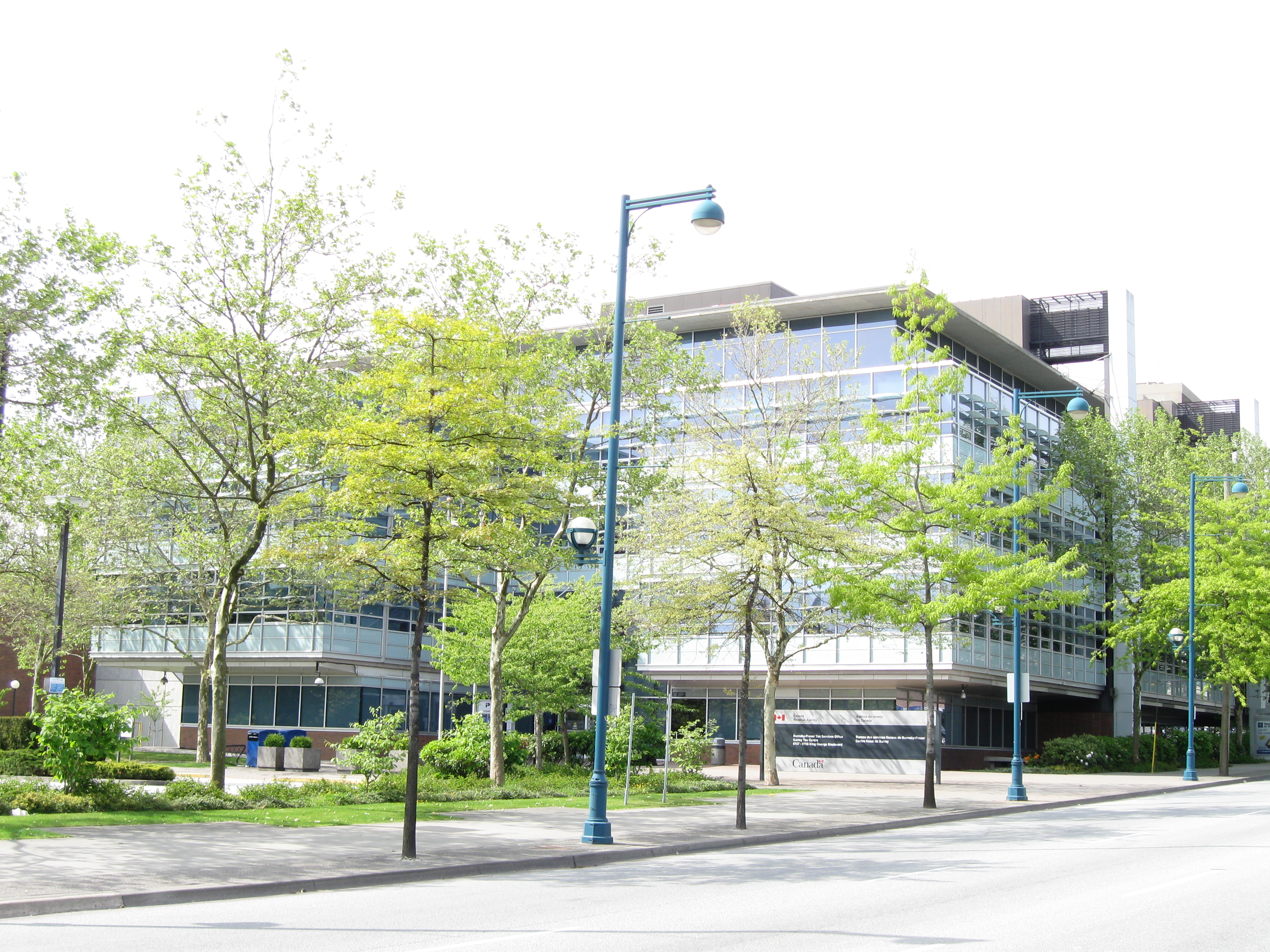
CRA office in Surrey, British Columbia

Outside of its headquarters, the CRA's operations across Canada are divided into four regions, which help to carry out the agency's operations in different regions of the country. Each region is headed by an Assistant Commissioner, who oversees activities in their region, including that of tax centres (TCs) and tax services offices (TSOs) in their area of responsibility.

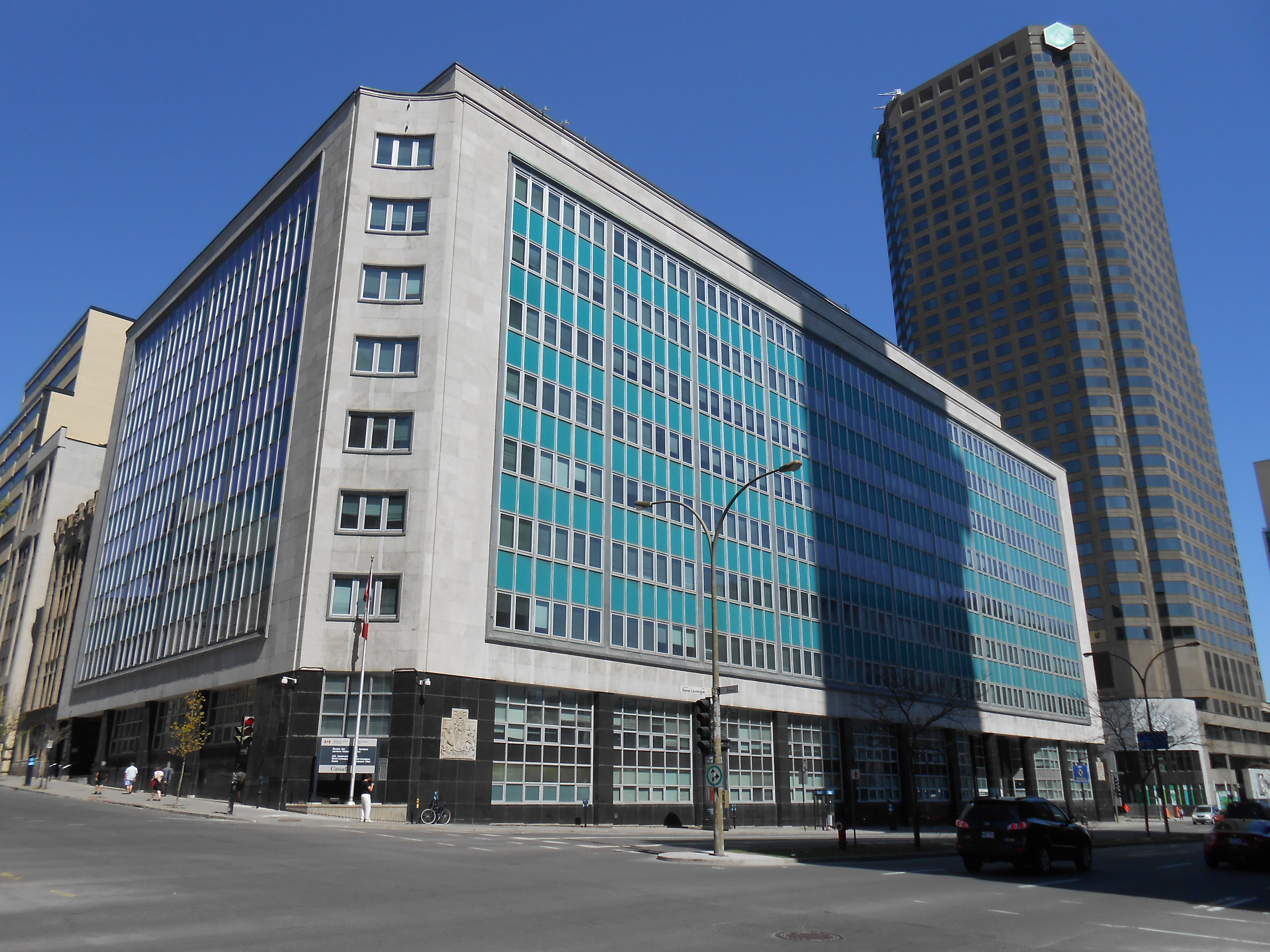
CRA office in downtown Montreal, Quebec

- Atlantic
- Ontario
- Quebec
- Western

==== Tax centres (TC) ====
Tax centres are responsible for intaking and processing individual and business tax returns. There are four tax centres located across Canada, each assigned their own geographic areas of responsibility, which may vary depending on the type of return:

- Jonquière Tax Centre (Quebec)
- Prince Edward Island Tax Centre (Atlantic)
- Sudbury Tax Centre (Ontario)
- Winnipeg Tax Centre (Prairie & Pacific)

==== Tax services offices (TSO) ====
Tax services offices are field offices which handle more complex audit and collection files for the agency, generally those which involve direct interaction with taxpayers. While TSOs are present in every province, the territories do not currently have active TSOs, and are instead under the jurisdiction of TSOs located in other parts of Canada. Tax services offices are sometimes divided into branch offices for organizational purposes.

There are twenty-five TSOs situated across Canada, and are organized as follows, with any branch offices indicated in indented bullets under the corresponding TSO where applicable:

List of CRA Tax services offices (TSOs) by province
Province	Tax services offices (TSOs)
Alberta	Edmonton (Note: Also responsible for the Northwest Territories.); Southern Alberta; Calgary; Lethbridge; Red Deer
British Columbia	Fraser Valley; Surrey; Southern Interior British Columbia; Kelowna; Penticton; Vancouver; Vancouver Island and North; Victoria; Prince George (Note: Also responsible for Yukon.)
Manitoba	Brandon; Winnipeg
New Brunswick	New Brunswick; Bathurst; Moncton; Saint John
Newfoundland and Labrador	St. John's
Nova Scotia	Halifax; Sydney
Ontario	East Central Ontario; Belleville; Kingston; Peterborough; Hamilton Niagara; Hamilton; St. Catharines; London-Windsor; London; Windsor; North Central Ontario; Barrie; Sudbury; Ottawa (Note: Also responsible for Nunavut.); Toronto Centre; Toronto East; Toronto North; Toronto West-Thunder Bay; Mississauga; Thunder Bay
Quebec	Central and Southern Quebec; Brossard; Sherbrooke; Eastern Quebec; Quebec City; Rimouski; Montreal; Western Quebec; Gatineau; Laval; Rouyn-Noranda
Saskatchewan	Regina; Saskatoon

==== National Verifications and Collections Centres (NVCC) ====
National Verifications and Collections Centres are responsible for non-complex files related to collection, verification, and validation that do not involve in-person interaction. These new facilities were introduced by the agency in 2016 as part of an effort to modernize the Agency's services. There are three NVCCs located across Canada:

- St. John's NVCC
- Shawinigan NVCC
- Surrey NVCC

==== Northern Service Centres ====
In 2019, the CRA opened introduced Northern Service Centres to access to tax services and assistance for residents in the Yukon, Northwest Territories, and Nunavut, co-located with existing Service Canada offices. There are three NSCs located across the North:

- Whitehorse NSC (Yukon)
- Yellowknife NSC (Northwest Territories)
- Iqaluit NSC (Nunavut)

=== Employees ===
As of the 2018-19 fiscal year, the CRA employed about 43,908 people, making it the largest organization within the federal government by personnel. Despite being headquartered in Ottawa, only about 12,000 employees are based in the National Capital Region. Of these employees, 32,598 (74.2%) were indeterminate or permanent employees, 1,251 (2.8%) were students, and 10,057 (22.9%) were contract employees. The average age of a CRA employee is 45 years old.

Under the Financial Administration Act, the CRA is designated under Schedule V as a separate agency outside of the core public administration, which allows the CRA to establish different job classifications, pay rates, and enter into labour negotiations differently from other government departments and agencies. Consequently, the job classifications used by CRA may not align with those typically used in other parts of the public service.

==== Unions ====
Executives, management, and students are generally not represented by a union. However, the majority of CRA employees are represented by Union of Taxation Employees, which is a component of Public Service Alliance of Canada. Auditors, investigators and computer systems employees are represented by Professional Institute of the Public Service of Canada.

== Operations ==
The Canada Revenue Agency (CRA) administers the federal tax system and delivers benefit programs on behalf of the Government of Canada. Its responsibilities include the collection of personal and corporate income taxes, the Goods and Services Tax/Harmonized Sales Tax (GST/HST), excise duties, and other levies. The Agency enforces compliance through audits, examinations, collections, and penalties when required.

In addition to tax collection, the CRA administers income-tested benefits and credits such as the Canada Child Benefit and the GST/HST Credit. The Agency also provides administrative services for provincial and territorial governments, including the collection of personal income tax on their behalf under tax collection agreements. Through these combined activities, the CRA is responsible for managing a significant portion of federal and provincial government revenues and the delivery of major social benefits.

== Tax collection ==
The CRA is responsible for collecting several taxes on behalf of the federal government, and most provincial and territorial governments (except Quebec), including personal income taxes, corporate taxes, sales taxes, fuel charges, and certain excise taxes as defined under the Excise Tax Act. As a separate agency, the CRA maintains partnerships and agreements with provincial, territorial, and other levels of government to administer non-harmonized sales tax programs on a cost-recovery basis.

=== Income tax ===
Personal income taxes

The Canada Revenue Agency collects most individual income taxes in Canada. Canada uses tax brackets to determine an individual's tax obligations, the rates of which are set by the Department of Finance. Personal income taxes are levied by both the federal government and provincial governments, each with separate rates, but are collected together with the exception of Quebec.

Based on individual earnings, employers will typically deduct income tax, in addition to Canada Pension Plan (CPP) or Quebec Pension Plan (QPP) and Employment Insurance (EI) deductions from an employee's paycheque. However, taxpayers that rely on rental or investment income, or are self-employed generally do not have taxes automatically deducted from their pay, must remit tax payments to the CRA either as a lump-sum or in quarterly instalments.

While most taxpayers file only through the CRA, Quebec residents file separately with the CRA and Revenu Québec each year.

==== Corporate income taxes ====
Taxes for provincial corporations in Canada are administered by the CRA, except for provinces of Alberta and Quebec. Ontario previously administered corporate taxes until 2008, after which the CRA took over responsibility collecting these taxes. The provinces maintain dual tax rates, with a lower rate applicable to income that qualifies for the federal small business deduction, and the higher rate to all other forms of income. While some provinces adhere to the business limit for the lower rate set by the federal governments, other provinces choose to maintain their own rate.

=== Goods and Services Tax (GST) ===
The Canada Revenue Agency collects the Goods and Services Tax (GST) (the Canadian federal value added tax) of 5 per cent in all provinces. In Quebec, under an agreement with the federal government, Revenu Québec administers the GST to businesses, and administers Quebec's own Quebec Sales Tax (QST). The Goods and Services Tax was introduced in 1991 at 7 per cent added to the value of most sales of goods and services. The GST was reduced to 6 per cent in 2006 and 5 per cent in 2008, the current rate.

=== Harmonized Sales Tax (HST) ===
In Prince Edward Island, New Brunswick, Newfoundland and Labrador, Nova Scotia and Ontario the Goods and Services Tax (GST) has been replaced by the Harmonized Sales Tax (HST). The Harmonized Sales Tax combines the national GST and the provincial sales tax into a single tax. The HST is administered by the CRA. Each province that has Harmonized Sales Tax receives its portion of the HST from the CRA.

In 2013, British Columbia removed HST after public protests against the newly taxed items under HST that were not taxed under the PST/GST system.

== Benefits delivery ==
CRA administers social benefits and tax credits on behalf of the federal government and most provinces and territories. Notable benefits and credits at the federal level include the Canada Child Benefit (CCB), which aims to assist families with children, the Climate Action Incentive (CAI), which pays dividends directly to Canadians as part of Canada's carbon pricing scheme and the Disability Tax Credit (DTC), which helps eligible recipients with disabilities reduce the amount of income tax they owe.

=== Canada Child Benefit ===
The Canada Child Benefit (CCB) is a non-taxable benefit for Canadians with children under 17 to assist them with the cost of living. The amount that a taxpayer receives through the CCB is tied to household income, which could include the income for a taxpayer's spouse. As such, taxpayers are required to file their taxes, in order to be assessed for and receive the benefit. The CCB was implemented in July 2016, and builds upon existing benefit programs (UCCB and CCTB) in addition to other child-related credits.

=== COVID-19 emergency benefits ===
The economic impact of COVID-19 pandemic resulted in the temporary and permanent closure of businesses throughout Canada, leading to the loss of several thousand jobs. This resulted in the creation of several economic measures targeting different sectors of Canadian society, which the CRA was tasked with administering.

The Canada Emergency Response Benefit (CERB) was introduced as a temporary benefit available to Canadians who stopped working involuntarily due to the pandemic. It provides $2,000 per month successful applicants during the eligible period. Income earned through CERB was taxable and those who applied without being eligible could have face penalties during future tax assessments. Eligible recipients were required to have also earned $5,000 in income during the 2019 tax year, and could not earn more than $1,000 per month when claiming CERB. The benefit was administered jointly by the CRA and Service Canada, with nearly 8.5 million Canadians applying for the benefit. representing nearly 21.5 million unique applications. The program was closed on December 2, 2020.

Similarly, the Canada Emergency Student Benefit (CESB) was developed as a parallel benefit for high school graduates, post-secondary students, and recent post-secondary graduates who do not qualify for CERB, with a shorter eligibility period of four months. CESB received about 2.1 million applicants, with over 675,000 unique applicants as of August 2020.

=== Scientific Research and Experimental Development (SR&ED) Tax Incentive Program ===
The Scientific Research and Experimental Development (SR&ED) tax incentive program provides support in the form of tax credits and refunds to corporations, partnerships or individuals who conduct scientific research or experimental development in Canada. You can find the agency's website page for the tax incentive here.

According to an Access to Information release (CRA file A-2025-000402), the Canada Revenue Agency applied gross negligence penalties to SR&ED claimants in multiple years between 2018 and 2024. The number of penalties ranged from 0 in 2020–2021 to 80 in 2024, with annual penalty amounts between $0 and approximately $5.2 million. Over the same period, between 367 and 1,176 SR&ED claims were fully denied each year, with denied expenditures ranging from roughly $29 million to $76 million.

== Compliance ==
=== Audits ===
The CRA performs audits with their 1700 auditors to ensure that taxpayers are meeting their tax obligations, are compliant with tax legislation, and receive the benefits they are entitled to. Auditors have the right to examine the books and records of a taxpayer, examine the property in an inventory of a taxpayer, enter the taxpayer's premises or place of business, require the owner or manager of a property to give all reasonable assistance and to answer questions, and require a taxpayer or other person to provide information or documents. Taxpayers must cooperate with auditors or may face obstruction charges under section 238 of the Income Tax Act.

Income tax audits are done at a Tax Service Office (TSO). Examiners that work in the office audit program restrict their examination to business expenses reviews. They conduct their examination by correspondence and do not visit a business in the field. Auditors working the SME (Small and Medium Enterprises), Basic File, and Large File programs conduct their audits in the field, typically at the taxpayer's place of business. The audit conducted by field auditors are not restricted and could cover many and any issues in a tax return.

GST/HST audits are done by TSOs. The Refund Integrity program deals only with a credit return, that is, a GST/HST return that requests a refund. The prepayment examination is a restricted audit of input tax credits (ITCs). Post audit is a full audit of GST/HST returns and that covers not only ITC but also GST/HST collected.

When an auditor feels as though they cannot rely upon the books and records of the taxpayer being audited, they can avail themselves of the net worth methodology. In this method, rather than auditing the actual books and records of the taxpayer, the auditor calculates the difference between the taxpayer's net worth (assets less liabilities) at the beginning of the audit period and at the end of the audit period. The auditor then adds to the change in net worth (an increase or decrease), the cost of living for the taxpayer for the period in question. The sum of these two figures will be used by the auditor to determine the taxable income for the taxpayer over the audit period. This figure is in turn compared to the figure reported by the taxpayer. While this methodology is widely used, the CRA Auditor's manual indicates that it is a method of last resort, which should only be used in limited circumstances.

=== Investigations ===
CRA operates four investigation programs: Voluntary Disclosures Program, Informant Leads Program, Special Enforcement Program and Criminal Investigations Program.

- Voluntary Disclosures Program (VDP): A program that allows taxpayers to avoid penalty or prosecution if they choose to correct inaccurate or incomplete information, or to disclose information previously withheld to CRA. In order to be accepted into this program, the taxpayer's action or omission must involve the application, or potential application of a penalty by CRA and he/she is willing to make a complete disclosure.
- Informant Leads Program (ILP): This program allows for citizens to report individuals or businesses who may be committing tax evasion or other tax-related offences.
- Special Enforcement Program (SEP): As proceeds of crime are taxable, this program specifically conducts audits and undertake other civil enforcement actions on individuals known or suspected of deriving income from illegal activities. Collections Officers are responsible for collecting taxes owed and to seize assets under the Income Tax Act. The program was eliminated after the 2012 federal budget cut.
- Criminal Investigations Program (CIP): Investigators from this program are responsible for suspected cases of tax evasion, fraud and other serious violations of tax laws. Criminal Investigators are given badges and can only exercise investigative power in compliance with the Canadian Charter of Rights and Freedoms.

=== CPP/EI rulings ===
The CRA is responsible for making CPP/EI rulings, that is, to determine whether any wages or payments are insurable under Canadian Pension Program and/or Employment Insurance program. The substance of a ruling is to determine whether an individual is an employee or a self-employed contractor. An employee can get EI benefits and contractor cannot. Normally, CPP/EI rulings are requested by Service Canada when they try to determine whether EI benefits should be paid out.

=== Arbitrary assessments ===
If a taxpayer does not file a tax return on time, the CRA may first send a request, like a reminder, to the taxpayer asking them to file the outstanding return. This first letter is called TX11. If the taxpayer still does not file the return, the CRA may send a second letter demanding that the return be filed. This second letter is called TX14. After that, a third letter, TX14D, could be issued, normally by registered mail, or could be delivered personally by a non-filer officer.

If a return is not filed after the computer-generated letters, such as TX11 and TX14, a non-filer officer could arbitrarily prepare a tax return for the taxpayer, normally generating a larger tax bill than what the taxpayer would expect. A notice of assessment under subsection 152(7) of the Income Tax Act will be issued. This 152(7) assessment is commonly known as an arbitrary assessment. Collection actions may follow. The taxpayer could file an amended tax return to reduce the tax bill. Once amended returns are filed, an audit is normally triggered.

If a non-filer officer determines that insufficient info is available for issuing an arbitrary assessment, they may refer the file to Investigations, who would then take the taxpayer to court. The taxpayer may be ordered by court to file the outstanding return, normally being imposed a court fine. If the taxpayer ignore the court order, they will be subject to contempt of court charges.

== Dispute resolution ==
=== Appeals ===
Taxpayers who believe the CRA has not assessed the correct amount of tax may dispute the assessment by filing an objection. There are strict timelines for filing an objection. The objection will be reviewed by the appeals program of CRA. An appeal officer will make a decision independent of audit. The appeal officer could confirm, vary, or vacate an audit. The appeal officer has the discretion to negotiate a settlement, normally under the condition that the taxpayer will not appeal further to the tax court.

If after the objection has been assessed, the taxpayer is still dissatisfied, an appeal may be made to the Tax Court of Canada within the permitted time. The court examines the claim and evidence the taxpayer submits, then looks at the evidence and arguments made by the CRA before passing judgment. The CRA, acting on behalf of the Minister of National Revenue, is represented by a tax litigation lawyer from the Department of Justice Canada. The CRA auditor becomes a witness for the purpose of providing evidence in tax court. Like any other Canadian court, the Tax Court operates by treating each side of a dispute as equals while applying tax law, contract law, constitutional law and the laws of evidence. In addition, the taxpayer is generally not responsible for costs in relation to their opponent, but only for their costs related to their own defence. In the event the appeal is successful, a repayment of legal costs from the CRA may be sought.

Tax court deals with issues that arise from an assessment under the Income Tax Act, the Excise Tax Act, the Excise Tax, 2001, the Underused Housing Tax, the Select Luxury Items Act, and the Greenhouse Gas Pollution Pricing Act, amongst others. It also deals with issues that arise under the Canada Pension Plan and the Employment Insurance Act.

If a tax return has no tax payable, the Tax Court could not deal with it. If the assessment is an assessment of a provincial tax, Tax Court could not deal with it and it has to be resolved in the appropriate provincial court.

Tax Court has two procedures: informal and general. The informal procedure is less onerous and the delay is generally shorter before the case is heard. A taxpayer could represent themselves or get a friend or accountant in the informal procedure. Informal procedures only deal with assessments to certain threshold and a taxpayer has to elect to take this route. Decisions from informal procedures are not precedent-setting and the judge has more discretion than in general procedures. Informal procedures allow limited appeal rights to the Federal Court of Appeal. General procedures deal with all assessments and require a taxpayer either to represent themselves or get a lawyer. The timeline for a general procedure case from the notice of appeal to the decision could take years. The decisions are precedent-setting.

If a taxpayer believes the Tax Court of Canada was wrong in considering the facts or the interpretation of the law, they could appeal the Tax Court decision to the Federal Court of Appeal, or even further to the Supreme Court of Canada.

=== Service complaints ===
Taxpayers aggrieved by the conduct of the CRA may file a service-related complaint. This complaint must deal strictly with the service provided, not the legal aspect of the service (for example, a service level complaint may be raised for unprofessional language, but not for a request for payment under the law).

The complaint is first passed to the office that is the subject of the complaint. If the taxpayer is not satisfied with the way the first office handles it, they may escalate the complaint to the regional office, which investigates the complaint and contacts the taxpayer. If the taxpayer remains unsatisfied, a complaint may be made to the Taxpayer Ombudsman.

=== Remission order ===
Remission orders are not commonly known and rarely granted. If a taxpayer agree to a tax assessment but are unable to pay, they could request a remission order to the CRA, which will then make a recommendation to the Minister, who will advise the governor-in-council to grant a remission order if the collection of tax is unjust.

== Taxpayer relief ==
Taxpayer relief is governed by subsection 220(3.1) of the Income Tax Act and section 281.1 of the Excise Tax Act. It gives the CRA the discretion to cancel some penalties and interest, to pay a personal income tax refund after 3 years of the tax return being assessed, and to accept late-filed elections.

The CRA will exercise their discretion when late filing is caused by extraordinary circumstances, such as flood or earthquake, by CRA delay or error, or by financial hardship.

A taxpayer may request relief on a prescribed form or may elect use a letter instead provided the points raised on the form are all covered by the letter. If the request is denied, a taxpayer could request a second review, which will be done by a higher rank official. If the request is still denied, a taxpayer could request a judicial review of the decision in Federal Court (not the Tax Court). The federal court will determine whether CRA exercises its discretion reasonably. If not, the court will send the file back to the CRA for reconsideration. The court rarely will make a decision for CRA because the discretion is with CRA and not the court. If a taxpayer is not happy with the judicial decision, they can pursue an appeal at the Federal Court of Appeal.

== Oversight and accountability ==
=== Office of the Taxpayers' Ombudsperson ===
The Office of the Taxpayers' Ombudsperson is an arm's-length office which reports directly to the Minister of National Revenue to improve accountability at the CRA. The Taxpayers' Ombudsperson is appointed by the Governor-in-Council with a mandate to assist, advise, and inform the Minister of National Revenue about any matter relating to services provided to a taxpayer by the CRA. The Taxpayer's Ombudsperson is currently François Boileau, who was appointed October 5 2020.

In fulfilling this mandate, the Ombudsperson reviews complaints from taxpayers that report breaches of their service-related rights by the CRA. The Ombudsperson upholds the eight taxpayer service rights in the Taxpayer Bill of Rights that are directly related to the services delivered by the CRA. To uphold these rights, the Office of the Taxpayers' Ombudsperson facilitates access to the available redress mechanisms for taxpayers and raises awareness of the role of the office and the Taxpayers' Ombudsperson.

In addition to individual examinations, the Ombudsperson may, on its own initiative, conduct an examination of systemic service-related issues. The Minister of National Revenue may also request the Ombudsperson conducts an examination.

Examinations are reported to the Minister of National Revenue and made public Each year, the Ombudsperson releases an annual report that is presented to the Minister of National Revenue that is in turn tabled in Parliament.

=== Taxpayer Bill of Rights ===
In 2007, the Harper government introduced the Taxpayer Bill of Rights and the Commitment to Small Business to help improve the CRA's service to Canadians. The Taxpayer Bill of Rights is meant to enshrine the CRA's corporate values of professionalism, integrity, respect, and collaboration by setting clear standards for how taxpayers should be treated when interacting with the CRA. These rights include the right to privacy and confidentiality, to expect clear service standards, and to lodge service complaints and request formal reviews without fear of reprisal.

== Criticism and controversies ==
=== Charity audits ===
In 2011, the CRA revoked the charitable registration of the International Relief Fund for the Afflicted and Needy-Canada (IRFAN-Canada) after finding that it had provided more than $14.6 million to operating partners run by officials of Hamas, a designated terrorist entity. The revocation occurred against the backdrop of IRFAN-Canada's documented connections to other Canadian Muslim organisations. IRFAN-Canada had received more than $296,000 from the Muslim Association of Canada between 2001 and 2010, and was referenced in a 2015 court proceedings involving the National Council of Canadian Muslims, as reported by the Toronto Sun and Le Journal de Québec. Charity Intelligence Canada defended the CRA against accusations of "bias and discrimination" in its audits and rejected claims that IRFAN-Canada was unaware of being suspected of terrorism financing, citing evidence that the CRA had raised concerns about IRFAN-Canada's links to Hamas years before revoking its charitable status.

=== Call centre operations ===
In 2015, the CBC reported that an internal survey determined that 1 in 4 calls asking for help from the CRA's business enquiries call centre received inaccurate information.

=== Financial records to the U.S. government ===
In September 2019, the CRA was criticized for sending nearly 900,000 financial records of Canadian residents to the Internal Revenue Service in the United States. This represents significant growth from 700,000 in 2017 and 150,000 in 2014.

=== Tax complaints ===
In 2016, the Financial Post reported that the auditor general criticized the CRA for taking too long to respond to tax complaints. The delays cost Canadian taxpayers large sums of money in interest on the amounts in dispute.

=== Canada Emergency Response Benefit (CERB) ===
The CRA has been criticised for its handling of CERB. The CRA admitted in December 2020 that "unclear" instructions given to call centre agents relating to CERB led to confusion around eligibility. Since then, it has asked certain recipients to repay their benefit in full.

In 2023 the CRA began investigating its employees who had utilized the CERB benefit while being employed with the agency. On October 16 2024, following an internal investigation it was announced over 330 employees that worked for the CRA no longer work for the agency. An additional 30 employees were subjected to disciplinary measures.

=== Mismanagement of Taxpayer Funds ===
In 2023, the CRA admitted that it had paid out $100 million to scammers engaging in a "carousel scheme".

=== Settlement Practices and Controversy ===
In March 2016, it was claimed that the CRA violated its own policy by offering to forego imposing gross negligence penalties or criminal investigation of wealthy clients of KPMG engaged in what the CRA alleged were sham transactions to hide offshore assets if those taxpayers agreed to pay tax and arrears interest without contesting amounts owing. This was considered by some experts as violating standard CRA policy, according to which such misconduct would only be eligible for the waiver of penalties if the taxpayer voluntarily disclosed the misconduct before CRA learned of the practice. The incident sparked internal division. In May 2022, Federal Court filings revealed that the CRA granted tax deals to a major, unnamed corporation based in the United States and Netherlands relating to transfer pricing allocation of international goods and services..

== See also ==
- Canada Border Services Agency
- Canadian efile
- NETFILE
- Taxation in Canada
- Inter-American Center of Tax Administrations
- Internal Revenue Service, the US equivalent
- HM Revenue & Customs, the UK equivalent
