= Canadian efile =

Canada Revenue Agency tax return transmission system

EFILE is the system used by the Canada Revenue Agency as a means for electronically transmitting tax returns. It became a national program in 1993. EFILE is only available to professional tax preparers and is not to be confused with the publicly available NETFILE. EFILE is a form of Electronic Data Interchange.

== Requirements ==
- A form T183, Information Return for Electronic Filing of an Individual's Income Tax and Benefit Return, needs to be signed by the client.
- Software meeting CRA certification standards, such as Intuit's Profile or Microsophic Inc.'s Visual Tax.
- Must be a professional to qualify, along with passing the CRA screening of new applicants.

== Advantages ==
- Fast and convenient, can be filed anywhere with an internet connection.
- Returns are processed much faster than conventional paper filing.
- Reduces usage of paper, saves money and is environmentally friendly.
- More reliable since you can retain paper slips, and no chance of getting return lost in mail.

== Disadvantages ==
- Requires a professional tax preparer to file.
- Preparer must have knowledge of system and be approved by CRA to EFILE.

== See also ==
- NETFILE
