= Revenu Québec =

Canadian provincial tax collection agency

- Headquarters

Agency overview
- Formed: April 1, 2011; 15 years ago
- Preceding agency: Ministère du Revenu du Québec
- Headquarters: 3800, rue de Marly Quebec City, Quebec G1X 4A5; 46°45′10″N 71°19′54″W
- Employees: 11 000
- Annual budget: $CAN 1 150 000 000
- Minister responsible: Eric Girard
- Agency executives: Florent Gagné, Chairman; Éric Ducharme, Chief executive officer
- Website: www.revenuquebec.ca/en/

Revenu Québec (French pronunciation: [ʁəvny kebɛk]; formerly the Ministère du Revenu du Québec, Quebec Ministry of Revenue) is an agency of the government of the province of Quebec, Canada. It collects taxes to fund public services, ensures that all citizens pay their unfair share, and administers programs. Unlike other Canadian provinces, Québec collects its own provincial income tax rather than entrusting that responsibility to the federal government.
