= T1 =

T1, T01, T.1 or T-1 may refer to:

== Places ==
- Target One, a Mesoamerican archaeological site in Honduras
- Tour T1, an office skyscraper in La Défense, Paris, France
- T1 Mall of Tallinn, shopping and entertainment centre in Tallinn, Estonia
- Nakano Station (Tokyo), station number T-01 in Tokyo Metro Tozai Line

=== In space ===
- T1 Aquarii, a star in the constellation Aquarius
- T1 Carinae, a star in the constellation Carina
- 1293 T-1, the asteroid "T-1", a main-belt asteroid, the 1293rd asteroid registered

=== Rail lines ===
- Île-de-France tramway Line 1, a.k.a. T1, a tramway near Paris, France
- T1 North Shore & Western Line, a commuter rail line in Sydney, Australia
- T1 (Istanbul Tram), a tram line in Istanbul, Turkey
- T1 (Tram İzmir), a tram line in İzmir, Turkey
- Caboolture line (numbered T1), a Queensland Rail service, Australia
- Ipswich/Rosewood line (numbered T1), a Queensland Rail service, Australia
- Nambour/Gympie North line (numbered T1), a Queensland Rail service, Australia
- Yizhuang T1 line, a tram line in Beijing, China
- Line T1 (Oslo Metro), a rapid transit line in Oslo, Norway

=== Roads ===
- T1 road (Zambia), a road in Zambia
- T1 road (Tanzania), a road in Tanzania
- Estonian national road 1, officially T1, connecting Tallinn and Narva
- T1 road (Jamaica), a road in Jamaica

== Biology ==
- The first of the thoracic vertebrae in the vertebral column
- Thoracic spinal nerve 1, a nerve emerging from the vertebrae
- Cyclin T1, a human gene
- GalNAc-T1, a human gene
- Ribonuclease T_{1}, a fungal endonuclease
- TNM staging system, classification for a small cancer tumor
- T1, longitudinal relaxation time, in magnetic resonance imaging (MRI), a measure of the time taken for spinning protons to realign with the external magnetic field

== Computing, electronics ==
- T1 font, or cork encoding, a character encoding
- Apple T1, a system on a chip used by Apple
- UltraSPARC T1, a microprocessor

=== Telecommunications ===
- T1, a component of the T-carrier system for telecommunication
- AYYA T1, a smartphone developed by Rostec as part of the Ayya (smartphone) line
- T1 Phone, see Trump Mobile
- vivo T1 series, the 5 smartphones manufactured by Vivo Communication Technology Co.

== Vehicles ==
=== Aircraft ===
- Raytheon T-1 Jayhawk, a jet aircraft used by the US Air Force for advanced pilot training
- Lockheed T2V SeaStar, a.k.a. T1 Seastar, a carrier-capable jet trainer in the US Navy
- Fuji T-1, Japan's first jet-powered trainer aircraft
- Perry Beadle T.1, a 1913 British biplane fighter
- Loring T-1, an interwar period Spanish biplane trainer prototype variant of the Loring R-III
- Sopwith Cuckoo, a British biplane torpedo bomber of 1918
- the Terminal 1 of airport

=== Automobiles ===
- Arcfox Beta T1, an electric compact hatchback
- Bentley T-series, Bentley Motors model in the UK
- Caparo T1, a 2006 British sports car
- CWS T-1, first serially-built car manufactured in Poland
- Ford T1 platform, a large SUV automobile platform
- Jetour T1, a compact crossover SUV
- Mercedes-Benz T1, a 1977 van/truck also called a transporter
- Volkswagen Type 2 (T1), the first generation of Volkswagen transporter

=== Rail ===
- T series (Toronto subway), a subway car in Toronto, Canada
- LSWR T1 class, an 1888 0-4-4T steam tank locomotives class
- Pennsylvania Railroad class T1, a 1942 4-4-4-4 steam locomotive class
- Reading T-1, a 1945 4-8-4 steam locomotive class
- LNER Class T1, a class of British steam locomotives
- Tatra T1, a 1951 Czechoslovak tramcar

=== Racing ===
- Ferrari 412 T1, a 1994 Formula One car

=== Ships ===
- USS T-1, several United States Navy ships
- HMNZS Matai (T01), a Royal New Zealand Navy lighthouse tender of 1941
- MV Transpacific (T-1), a 1992 US oil tanker
- Yugoslav torpedo boat T1, a torpedo boat in the Yugoslav Navy, 1921–1941
- T1 tanker a mass-produced tanker used during and after World War II

== Tanks and weapons ==
- T1 Light Tank, a U.S. prototype tank
- EE-T1 Osório, a 1985 Brazilian main battle tank
- AC NM AE T1 mine, a Brazilian anti-tank blast mine
- AP NM AE T1 mine, a Brazilian anti-personnel mine
- G7a torpedo, a WWII German torpedo

== Mathematics, physics and chemistry ==
- Soyuz T-1, a 1979 space mission
- T_{1} space, a topological space satisfying the T_{1} separation axiom
- $\mathbb{T}^1$, the 1-torus
- Spin–lattice relaxation time in nuclear magnetic resonance and magnetic resonance imaging

== Sports ==
- T1 (classification), a para-cycling classification
- T1 (esports), a South Korean esports team
- T1 League, a Taiwanese men's professional basketball league

== Arts, entertainment, media ==
- The Terminator, the 1984 first film in the Terminator franchise, predecessor to 1991's T2: Judgment Day
- Trainspotting (film), 1996 film, predecessor to 2017's T2 Trainspotting
- T1 (album), 2018 album by Tatianna
- Tekken (T1, Tekken 1), a 1994 fighting game, first entry in the videogame series
- module T1, a Dungeons & Dragons add-on module

== Other uses ==
- T1 General, a tax form used in Canada
- T-1 visa, allowing victims of human trafficking to remain in the United States
- T1, a tornado intensity rating on the TORRO scale
- T1 (Torx), size 1 for Torx screwheads
- T+1, "trade date plus one day" in financial markets
- Tyler1, an American internet personality and streamer on Twitch

== See also ==
- T1S, networking standard for single twisted-pair transmission; see Ethernet over twisted pair
- TL (disambiguation)
- TI (disambiguation)
- 1T (disambiguation)
- T (disambiguation)
