= Billon =

Billon may refer to:

- Billon (alloy), a metal alloy containing mostly copper or bronze with small quantity of silver

== People ==
- Claudius Billon (1896–1944), French air force officer
- Jean-Louis Billon (born 1964), Ivorian politician
- Jonathan Le Billon (born 1980), British actor
- Nicolas Billon (born 1978), Canadian writer
- Philippe Le Billon, geographer, author, and professor
- Pierre Billon (writer) (born 1937), novelist and screenwriter
- Pierre Billon (director) (1901–1981), French film director and screenwriter
- René Billon (1931 – 2020), French footballer
- Thomas Billon (fl. 1617–1647), French anagrammatist
- Yves Billon (born 1946), French documentary film-maker

== See also ==
- Billion (disambiguation)
