= Trillion (disambiguation) =

Trillion is a number, either 1,000,000,000,000 (short scale) or 1,000,000,000,000,000,000 (long scale).

Trillion or Trillions may also refer to:

- Trillion (horse) (1974–1987), a French Thoroughbred racing mare
- Trillion (band), led by Dennis Frederiksen
- Trillion, a performer in the English hip pop quintet King
- Trillions, a 1971 science fiction novel by Nicholas Fisk
- "Trillions" (song), a song by American singer-songwriter Alicia Keys
- One trillion (basketball), specific box score of a basketball player
- Trilliant cut, or trillion, a triangular type of gemstone cut
- Trillion Fund, an equity crowdfunding platform
- Trillion Game, a Japanese manga

== See also ==
- Trillian (disambiguation)
- Trillionaire (disambiguation)
- Trillium (disambiguation)
- TN (disambiguation)
- 1T (disambiguation)
- Names of large numbers
- Long and short scales
