= Trillium (disambiguation) =

Trillium is a genus of flowering plants. It may also refer to:

- Trillium Brewing Company, an American brewery
- Trillium CNG, a subsidiary of WEC Energy Group
- Trillium Corporation, the former name of Telarium, a publisher of adventure games in the 1980s
- Trillium Cup, an annual two-team cup rivalry between Major League Soccer's Toronto FC and the Columbus Crew
- Trillium Digital Systems, a software company providing portable communications software products
- Trillium Model, a software engineering model for telecommunications systems
- Trillium (Buckeye), a planned community in Buckeye, Arizona, US
- Trillium (series), a series of fantasy novels by Andre Norton, Marion Zimmer Bradley and Julian May
- Trillium (Vertigo), an 8-issue comic series by Jeff Lemire
- Trillium Software, a suite of software products from Harte Hanks
- Telereal Trillium a British property company
- Trillium, a heavy metal band founded and fronted by Amanda Somerville
- Trillium, imprint of Ohio State University Press
- Trillium Community Health Plan, a health insurance company in Oregon owned by Centene

== Canada ==
The white trillium (Trillium grandiflorum) has been Ontario's official floral emblem since 1937.

- Trillium Book Award, a literature prize sponsored by the Government of Ontario
- Trillium Gift of Life Network, government agency regulating organ donation in Ontario
- Trillium Health Partners, a group of three hospitals serving Mississauga and western Toronto
- Trillium Line, a diesel-powered light-rail line in Ottawa
- Trillium Park, a provincial park in Toronto
- Trillium Party of Ontario, a social conservative political party in Ontario
- Trillium Railway, a Canadian short-line railway operating in the Niagara Region of Ontario

== Ships ==
- PS Trillium, passenger ferry on Lake Ontario
- HMCS Trillium, Royal Canadian Navy vessel
- Trillium-class freighter - class of bulk carriers owned by Canada Steamship Lines

== See also ==
- Trillian
- Trillion (disambiguation)
