= Tatianna =

American drag queen, musician, and reality television personality

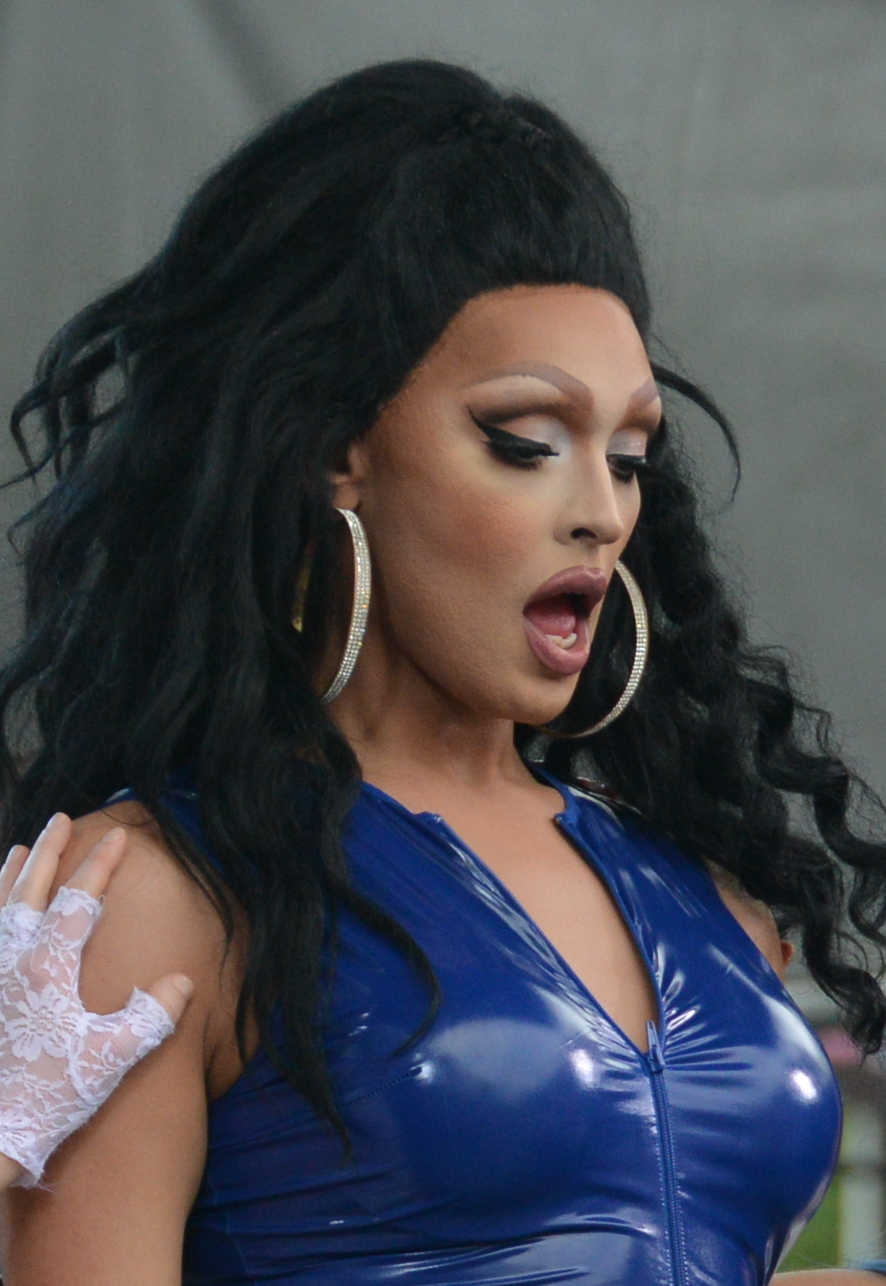
- Tatianna performing at Capital Pride in 2018
- Born: Joseph Michael Santolini; December 1, 1987 (age 38); Arlington, Virginia, USA
- Other name: Joey Santolini
- Occupations: Drag queen, comedian, musician, reality television personality
- Years active: 2007-present
- Known for: RuPaul's Drag Race (season 2); RuPaul's Drag Race All Stars (season 2)

Joseph Michael "Joey" Santolini (born December 1, 1987), better known by his stage name Tatianna, is an American drag queen, musician, and reality television personality from Washington, D.C. He is best known for competing on the second season of RuPaul's Drag Race and later the second season of RuPaul's Drag Race All Stars. She released her debut album, T1, in 2018.

== Early life ==
Santolini was born on December 1, 1987 in Arlington, Virginia. He is of Italian and African American descent. He originally attended Yorktown High School, but moved to Falls Church High School after his freshman year due to bullying. He received a license in cosmetology after his senior year in high school, from where he graduated in 2006. He started dressing as a girl when he was fourteen, occasionally attended school in drag, and started drag professionally in 2007; his first show was performed at Apex, a gay bar in Washington D.C. He originally applied for season one of Drag Race, but was rejected at the time. At the time of the cast reveal of Drag Race, he was residing in Falls Church with his grandparents, working at a hair salon in Arlington, and corresponding with his mother and stepfather, who were then living in Florida.

== Career ==
Tatianna was announced as one of twelve contestants for the second season of RuPaul's Drag Race in November 2009. During the show, she won the first edition of the annual "Snatch Game" challenge, playing Britney Spears in episode four. She overall placed fourth in the competition after losing a lip sync of Aretha Franklin's "Something He Can Feel" to competitor Jujubee. Six years later, she was selected as one of ten contestants for the second season of RuPaul's Drag Race: All Stars, which was announced on June 17, 2016. She placed in the top two in the first episode, but lost a lip sync to Roxxxy Andrews. She was controversially eliminated by Alaska the following episode after placing in the bottom for his second snatch game as Ariana Grande. She returned in episode five and won $5,000 with Alyssa Edwards after a double-save lip sync to Rihanna's "Shut Up and Drive". She was controversially eliminated by Alaska again for placing in the bottom that following episode. She finished in sixth place overall.

Outside of Drag Race, she hosted her own web show on WOWpresents called Tea With Tati which premiered in April 2018. She announced on June 18, 2018, the release of a new fragrance called Choices produced by Xyrena.

Tatianna performed live with Charli XCX on October 13, 2018, singing a duet of Charli's song "1999".

She portrayed Ariana Grande in the music video for Taylor Swift's "You Need to Calm Down" on June 17, 2019.

On August 26, 2019, Tatianna performed alongside Taylor Swift during her 2019 MTV Video Music Awards performance.

As a part of Pride Month 2023, she announced a partnership with the Washington D.C., Baltimore, and Eastern Shore branch of McDonald's.

== Personal life ==
In October 2019, Tatianna was detained outside of X Midtown, an Atlanta nightclub, when she entered an employee's only door and reportedly verbally assaulted an employee. No charges were pressed.

== Music ==
Tatianna released her first single, "True" on November 8, 2010. A second single, "Touch" was released on May 6, 2011. Her third single, "Losing Control" was released on August 14, 2012. After a four-year hiatus, Tatianna released "The Same Parts" on September 1, 2016. He performed the single on the premiere episode of All Stars 2 as a spoken word version. His fifth single, "Transform" was released on October 26, 2016. She released "Use Me" on November 28, 2017. Unlike his other singles, an official music video was released the same day as the single. He released her eleven-track debut album, "T1" on May 28, 2018. Rapper Cazwell and drag queen Salvadora Dali are featured guests on the album. A video for the fifth track, "CYA", was released on August 30, 2018.

== Filmography ==
=== Film ===
| Year | Title | Role | Notes | Ref |
|---|---|---|---|---|
| 2020 | Workhouse Queen | Herself | Documentary | |
| 2020 | Miss Americana | Herself | Documentary | |

=== Television ===
| Year | Title | Role | Notes |
|---|---|---|---|
| 2010 | RuPaul's Drag Race | Herself | Contestant (4th place) |
| 2010 | RuPaul's Drag Race: Untucked | Herself | |
| 2016 | RuPaul's Drag Race All Stars | Herself | Contestant (6th place) |
| 2016 | Watch What Happens Live with Andy Cohen | Herself | Guest |
| 2021 | Watch What Happens Live with Andy Cohen | Herself | Guest |

=== Music videos ===
| Year | Title | Artist | Ref. |
|---|---|---|---|
| 2016 | "The T" | Alaska Thunderfuck | |
| 2017 | "Use Me" | Herself | |
| 2018 | "CYA" | Herself | |
| 2019 | "You Need to Calm Down" | Taylor Swift | |
| 2019 | "Hurt My Feelings" | Herself | |

=== Web series ===
| Year | Title | Role | Notes | Ref. |
|---|---|---|---|---|
| 2014 | Fashion Photo RuView | Herself | | |
| 2014 | Ring My Bell | Herself | Guest | |
| 2016 | The Final Lap | Herself | Season 2, Episode 2 | |
| 2018 | Tea with Tati | Herself | Host | |
| 2018 | Hey Qween! | Herself | Guest | |

== Discography ==
=== Albums ===
| Title | Album details |
|---|---|
| T1 | Released: May 28, 2018; Label: Madscience; Format: Digital download |

=== Singles ===
| Single | Year | Album |
|---|---|---|
| "True" | 2010 | Non-album singles |
| "Touch" | 2011 | Non-album singles |
| "Losing Control" | 2012 | Non-album singles |
| "The Same Parts" | 2016 | Non-album singles |
| "Transform" | 2016 | Non-album singles |
| "Use Me" | 2017 | T1 |
| "Try" (featuring Salvadora Dali) | 2018 | T1 |
| "CYA" | 2018 | T1 |
| "Hurt My Feelings" | 2019 | Non-album single |
