= René Billon =

French footballer (1931–2020)

Personal information
- Date of birth: 2 August 1931
- Place of birth: Kerlaz, France
- Date of death: 20 October 2020 (aged 89)
- Position: Defender

Youth career
- –1952: Kerlaz Sport
- 1964–: La Plancoëtine

Senior career*
Years	Team	Apps	(Gls)
1952–1964	Rennes	92	(1)
Total		92	(1)
- * Club domestic league appearances and goals

René Billon (2 August 1931 – 20 October 2020) was a French footballer who played for Rennes as a defender.

== Biography ==
Born on 2 August 1931 in Kerlaz in the south of Finistère, Billon began his career with his hometown team of Kerlaz Sport, founded in 1943. A cousin of fellow footballer Jean-Pierre Darchen, he played for Kerlaz Sport with his brothers Henri and Jean, and he showed very good qualities as a footballer in his youth. In 1952, at the age of 21, Billon joined Stade Rennais F.C. in their amateur group. He stayed there for nearly two years before making his professional debut in a Ligue 2 game on 18 April 1954 in a home match against Lyon. He only played in one fixture that season on the first team, led by Salvador Artigas. The following season, he became fully integrated within the professional squad and he served as their top defender. He scored the only professional goal of his career on 22 August 1954 in a game against Montpellier. In 1955–56, he played 28 league matches and helped the club ascend to Ligue 1.

Billon returned to the amateur group of Stade Rennais in 1956, where he stayed until the end of the 1961–62 season. He played his first Ligue 1 match on 26 February 1962 against Montpellier. He played a total of 11 Ligue 1 games that season. In 1962–63, coach Antoine Cuissard played him for six league games and for the Coupe Charles Drago before returning him to the amateur group. In 1964, Billon left Rennes to play for La Plancoëtine in Plancoët.

Billon died on 20 October 2020 at the age of 89.

== Honours ==
Rennes

- French Division 2: 1955–56
