= 1T =

1T may refer to:

- One-T, a French electronic musical project
- 1T-SRAM, a type of pseudostatic random-access memory
- 1T DRAM, a type of Dynamic random-access memory
- SSH 1T, alternate designation for Washington State Route 501
- 1T, a model of Chevrolet Chevette
- 1-T, a synthetic anabolic–androgenic steroid

== See also ==
- Trillion (disambiguation)
- T1 (disambiguation)
