= Trillionaire (disambiguation) =

A trillionaire is a person who has at least one trillion units of a currency.

Trillionaire may also refer to:

- "Trillionaire" (Bun B song), 2010
- "Trillionaire" (Future song), 2020
- Trillionaire$, a Canadian hip hop project

== See also ==
- Billionaire (disambiguation)
- Millionaire (disambiguation)
- Trillion (disambiguation)
