= Billion (disambiguation) =

Billion is a name for a large number. It may refer specifically to:

- 1,000,000,000 (10^{9}, one thousand million), the short scale definition
- 1,000,000,000,000 (10^{12}, one million million), the long scale definition

Billion may also refer to:

== Film and TV ==
- Billions (TV series), a Showtime series
- Billions (film), a 1920 silent comedy
- Mr. Billion, a 1977 film by Jonathan Kaplan

== Music ==
- "Billion", a song by Cardiacs from Sing to God, 1996
- "Billions" (song), a song by Caroline Polachek from Desire, I Want to Turn Into You, 2023
- "Billions", a song by Russell Dickerson from Yours, 2017

== Other ==
- Billion (company), a Taiwanese modem manufacturer
- Jack Billion (1939–2023), American politician

== See also ==
- Long and short scales
- Names of large numbers
- Billion laughs, an XML parser vulnerability
- Golden billion, a Russian term for the wealthy people of the developed world
- Billionaire (disambiguation)
- Billon (disambiguation)
- BN (disambiguation)
