= TI =

TI, ti, and variants may refer to:

== Arts and entertainment ==
- Ti/Si, the seventh syllable in the solfège technique
- The International (Dota 2), an esports tournament
- Twilight Imperium, a game

== Businesses and organizations ==
- TI-class supertankers, ships operated by Tankers International
- Texas Instruments, an American electronics company
- Telecom Italia, an Italian telecommunications company
- TI Group, previously Tube Investments, an English engineering company
- Therapeutics Initiative, a medication evaluation organization
- Thomistic Institute, a Catholic academic institute
- Tiger Inn, a Princeton University eating club
- Toastmasters International, a public speaking organization
- Former Tol Air, IATA code
- Tailwind Airlines, IATA code
- Transparency International, anti-corruption organisation
- Treasure Island Hotel and Casino, Las Vegas, US

== People ==
- Ti, a high-status official during the Fifth Dynasty of Egypt
- Ti. for Tiberius, a Roman given name
- T.I. (born 1980), American rapper
- TI, post-nominal initials used by awardees of Tamgha-e-Imtiaz, a Pakistani honour
- "Targeted individual", person claiming to be subject to "gang stalking"
- Ti, Bonnie Nettles, religious leader

== Places ==
- Ti, Oklahoma, US
- Thursday Island, Torres Strait
- Ticino, a canton (federated state) of Switzerland

== Science, technology, and mathematics ==
=== Biology and medicine ===
- Ti or Tī, a generic name in Polynesian languages for plants of the genus Cordyline, including:
  - Cordyline fruticosa, Tī, Tī pore (Māori), Kī (Hawaiian)
  - Cordyline australis (Tī kōuka or Cabbage tree, New Zealand)
  - Cordyline banksii (Tī ngahere or Forest cabbage tree, New Zealand)
  - Cordyline indivisa (Tī toī, tōī or Mountain cabbage tree, New Zealand)
  - Cordyline obtecta (Tī, Norfolk Island cabbage tree, Three Kings cabbage tree, Norfolk Island and New Zealand)
  - Cordyline pumilio (Tī rauriki, Tī koraha or Dwarf cabbage tree, New Zealand)
- Therapeutic index

=== Computing ===
- Ti (prefix symbol), of interim unit tebi; e.g. Tib for tebibit

=== Other uses in science, technology, and mathematics ===
- Topological insulator
- Titanium, symbol Ti, a chemical element
- Truncated icosahedron

== Other uses ==
- Ti (concept), a term meaning "substance" (體) in Chinese
- TI (cuneiform), a sign in cuneiform writing
- Ti, Old Swedish spelling of Týr, deity of Norse mythology
- Tigrinya language (ISO 639-1 code "ti")
- ti (digraph), the characters ⟨ti⟩
- Tenant inducement, in commercial real estate
- Tobu's Isesaki Line, Sano Line, Koizumi Line, and Kiryū Line (railway line prefix TI)

== See also ==
- Di (disambiguation) for several Chinese concepts; "Ti" is the Wade–Giles equivalent of "Di"
- TL (disambiguation)
- T1 (disambiguation)
