= Billionaire (disambiguation) =

A billionaire is a person who has a net worth of at least one billion units of a currency.

A centibillionaire is a person who has a net worth of at least one hundred billion units of a currency.

Billionaire(s) may also refer to:

- Billionaire (album), an album by Kathleen Edwards
- Billionaire (card game) or Pit, a commodity-trading card game
- "Billionaire" (song), a song by Travie McCoy ft. Bruno Mars
- "Billionaire", a song by Babymonster from Drip
- "Billionaire", a song by Peaches from I Feel Cream
- Billionaire (Los Angeles, California), a private residence in Bel Air designed by Bruce Makowsky

== See also ==
- Billion (disambiguation)
- Millionaire (disambiguation)
- Trillionaire (disambiguation)
