= BN =

BN, Bn or bn may refer to:

== Businesses and organizations ==
=== Arts and media ===
- RTV BN, a Bosnian Serb broadcaster
- Bandai Namco Holdings, a gaming and entertainment conglomerate
- Barnes & Noble, an American chain of bookstores
- BN (band), Belarusian rock band

=== Transport ===
- Braniff International Airways (IATA code BN), a former American airline in service from 1928 to 1982
- Britten-Norman, a British manufacturer, based on the Isle of Wight, producing Islander and Trislander aircraft
- La Brugeoise et Nivelles, a Belgian railway rolling stock manufacturer, now part of Alstom
- Burlington Northern Railroad, a United States railroad that operated from 1970 to 1996
- Horizon Airlines (Australia) (IATA code BN), a former Australian airline, ending service in 2004
- Bangka Belitung Islands (vehicle registration prefix BN)
- Balkan (vehicle registration suffix BN)

=== Other businesses and organizations ===
- Banca Nuova, an Italian bank
- Banque Nationale (disambiguation) several banks
- Barisan Nasional (also known as "National Front"), a political coalition in Malaysia
- British Naturism, the UK naturist society
- Groupe Danone (uronext stock exchange code BN), a French food-products multinational

== Military ==
- Bangladesh Navy
- Battalion, a large unit

== Places ==
=== Countries ===
- Brunei (ISO 3166: BN), Southeast Asia
- Bahrain (WMO: BN), West Asia
- Benin (FIPS 10-4: BN), West Africa
- Bosnia and Herzegovina (LOC MARC: BN), Europe

=== Regions ===
- BN postcode area, Sussex, England
- Bandarban District, Bangladesh
- Province of Benevento, Italy
- Bloomington-Normal, Illinois, US

=== Place of worship ===
- Baitun Nur Mosque, Calgary, Alberta, Canada

== Science, technology and mathematics ==
- .bn, Brunei's top-level Internet domain
- BN-reactor, a Russian nuclear reactor class
- Batch normalization, in artificial intelligence
- Benzyl functional group (Bn), in organic chemistry
- Billion (disambiguation) (bn), a number
- Boron nitride, a chemical compound
- Bulimia nervosa, an eating disorder
- Dynkin diagram B_{n}, in mathematical analysis

== Other uses ==
- BN (biscuit), a Franco-British brand of baked food
- Bachelor of Nursing, a professional degree
- Bacon Number, an actor's professional proximity to Kevin Bacon
- Bengali language (ISO 639: bn), spoken in eastern South Asia
- Billion (disambiguation)
