= Trillion Fund =

Defunct investment crowdfunding platform

- Website type: Crowdfunding
- Available in: English
- Headquarters: London, United Kingdom
- Website: www.trillionfund.com
- Commercial: Yes
- Launched: 2011; 15 years ago

Trillion Fund was an equity crowdfunding platform that raised money for environmental and social projects.

It was founded in 2011 by Dr. Michael Stein and Phillip Riches. The platform was launched in response to warnings given by the United Nations that it will take US$1 trillion of investment annually to prevent the world from warming by more than 2 degrees. This one trillion figure gave rise to the company's name.

Trillion was privately owned. Vivienne Westwood became a majority owner in March 2013, and Albion London bought a stake in April 2014. Mark Stevenson had a role in the advisory board of Trillion Fund. With the merger of Buzzbnk in 2014, the site had 14,000 members.

In 2019, the platform closed. According to the Trillion Fund website, "Trillion has closed & has repaid all loans."
