= Ford T platforms =

Series of automobiles by Ford

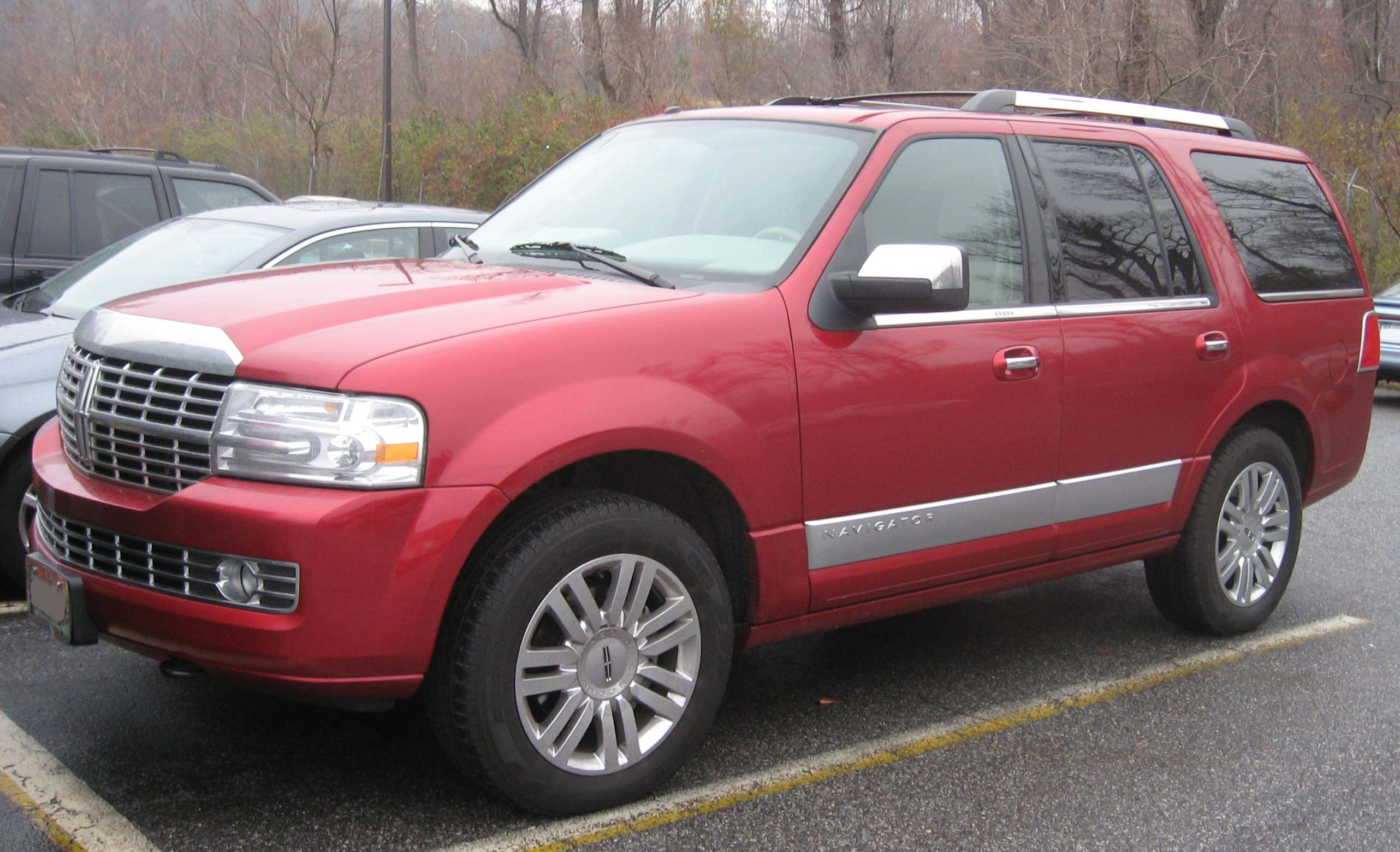
2007-2008 Lincoln Navigator

The Ford T platform is a series of Ford Motor Company's body-on-frame automobile platform.

== T1 ==
The T1 platform debuted in 2006 with the 2007 model year Ford Expedition, and shares elements with the 2004–2008 Ford F-150's chassis. For the 2007 model year, the Lincoln Navigator moved to the T1 as well.

Applications:

- 2007–2017 Ford Expedition / Ford Expedition EL (U324 / U354)
- 2007–2017 Lincoln Navigator / Lincoln Navigator L (U326 / U418)
- 2009–2014 Ford F-150 / Ford Lobo (P415)
- 2009–2014 Lincoln Mark LT (P415)
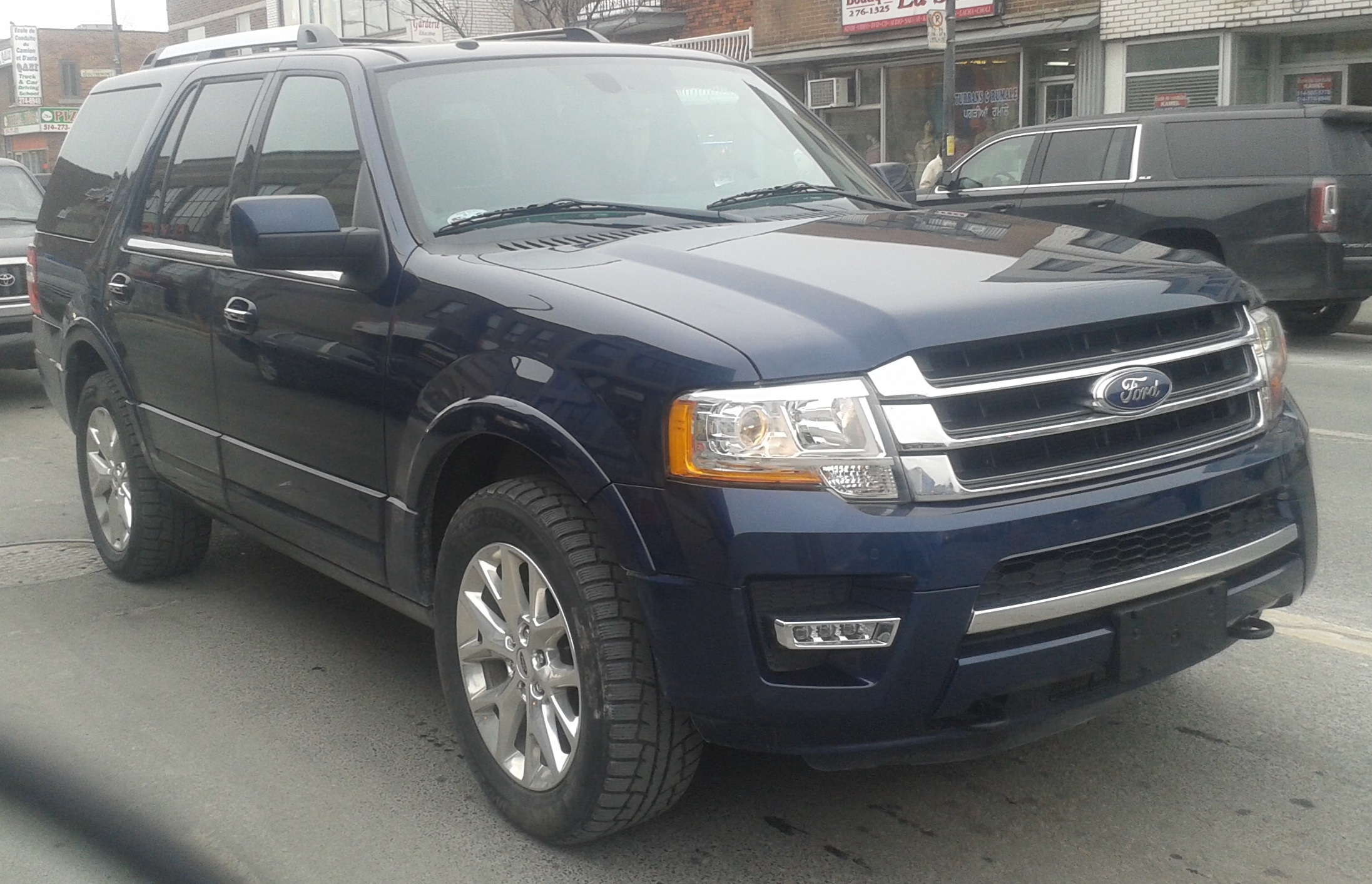
Ford Expedition / Expedition EL (U324 / U354)

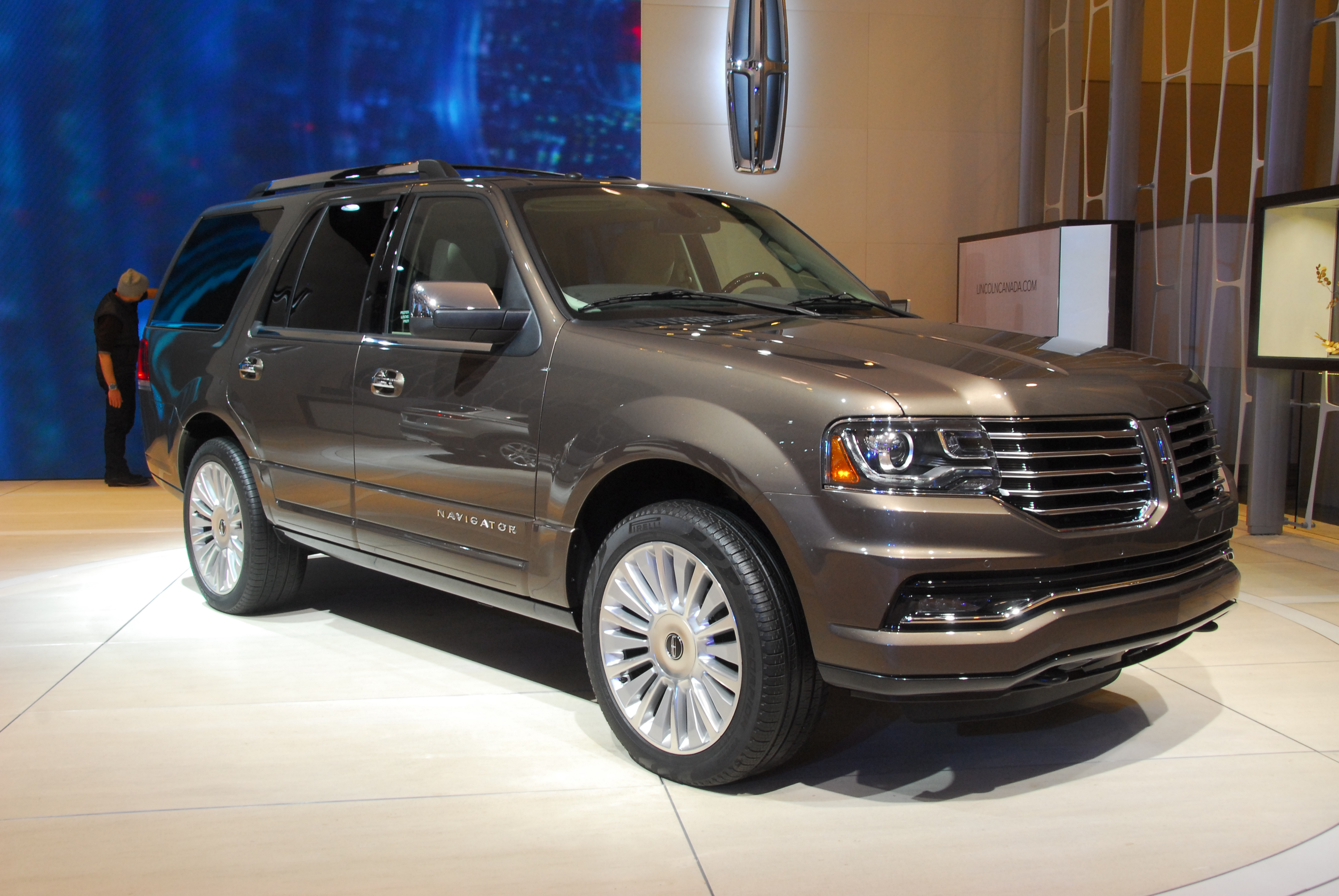
Lincoln Navigator / Navigator L (U326 / U354)

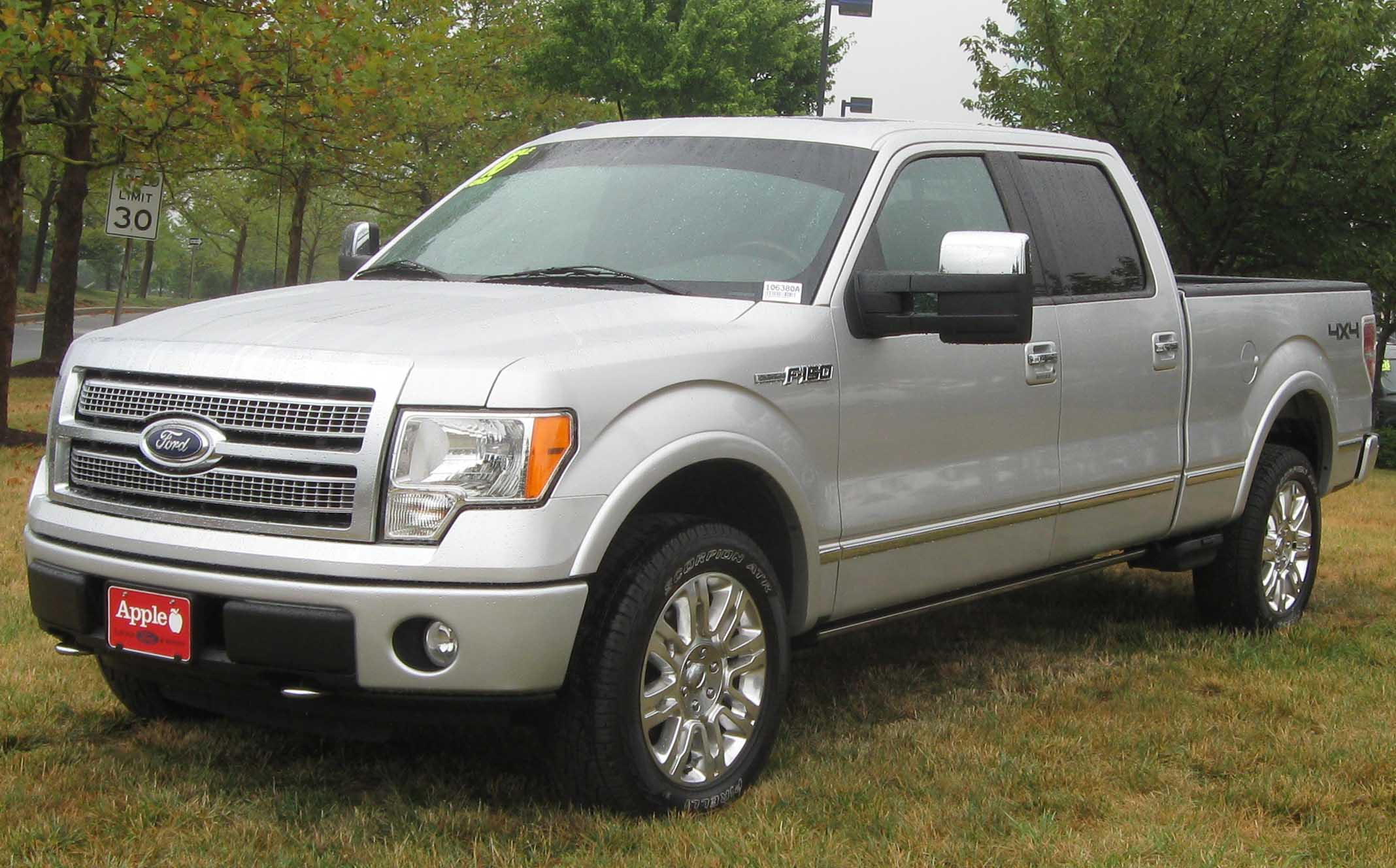
Ford F-150 / Lobo (P415)

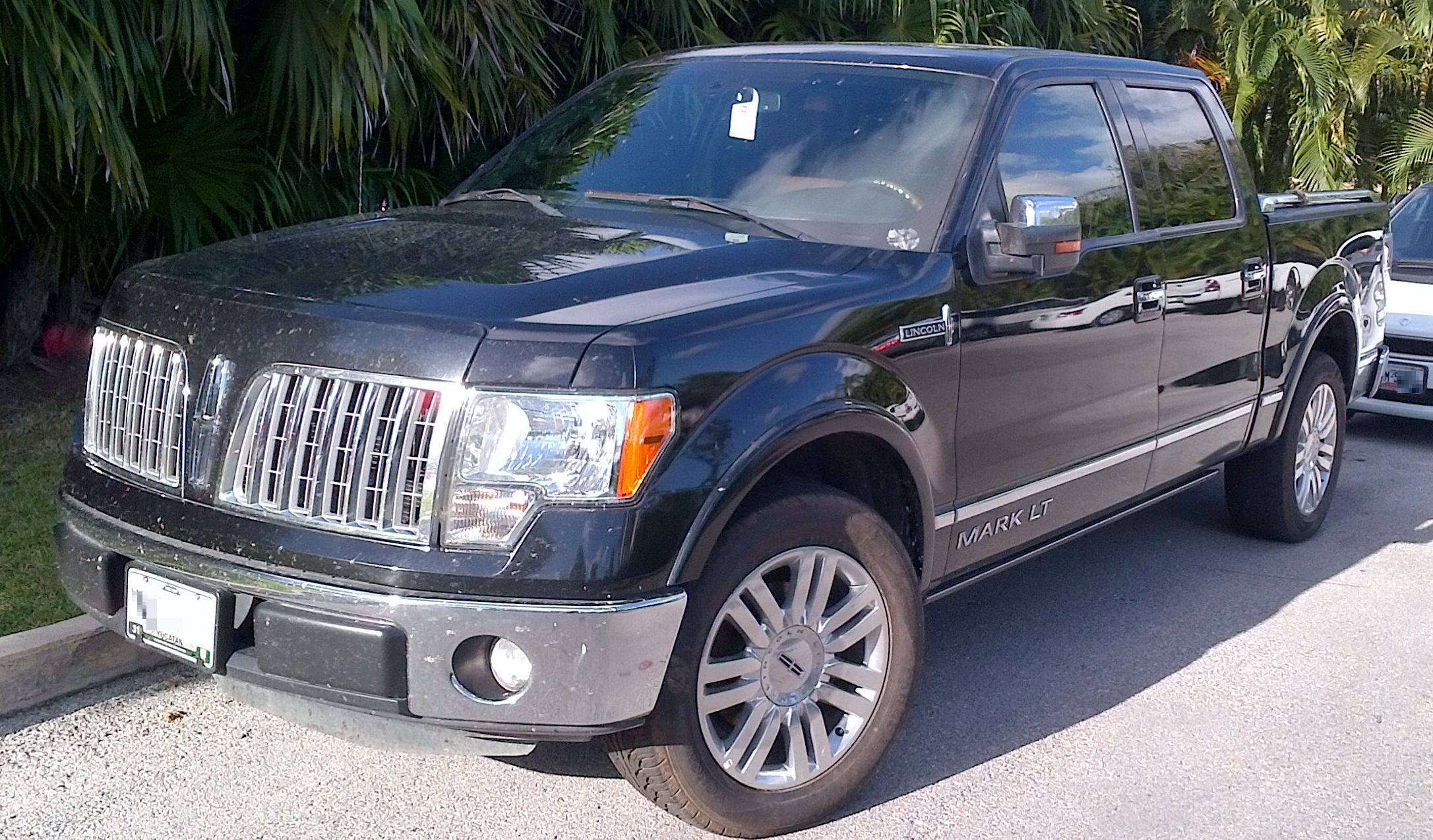
Lincoln Mark LT (P415)

== T3 ==
The T3 is Ford's incumbent large truck platform, which began production in November 2014, starting with the 2015 model year P552 F-150. The fourth generation Expedition, Expedition Max (formerly Expedition EL), Navigator and Navigator L are also built on this platform, shared with the Ford F-Series thirteenth generation chassis design from the P552 F-150 and P558 Ford Super Duty.

Applications:

- 2015–2020 Ford F-150 / Ford Lobo (P552)
- 2017–2022 Ford Super Duty (P558)
- 2018–2024 Ford Expedition / Ford Expedition Max (U553)
- 2018–2024 Lincoln Navigator / Lincoln Navigator L (U554)
- 2021–present Ford F-150 / Ford Lobo, 2022–2025 Ford F-150 Lightning (P702)
- 2023–present Ford Super Duty (P708)
- 2025–present Ford Expedition / Ford Expedition Max (U717)
- 2025–present Lincoln Navigator / Lincoln Navigator L (U718)
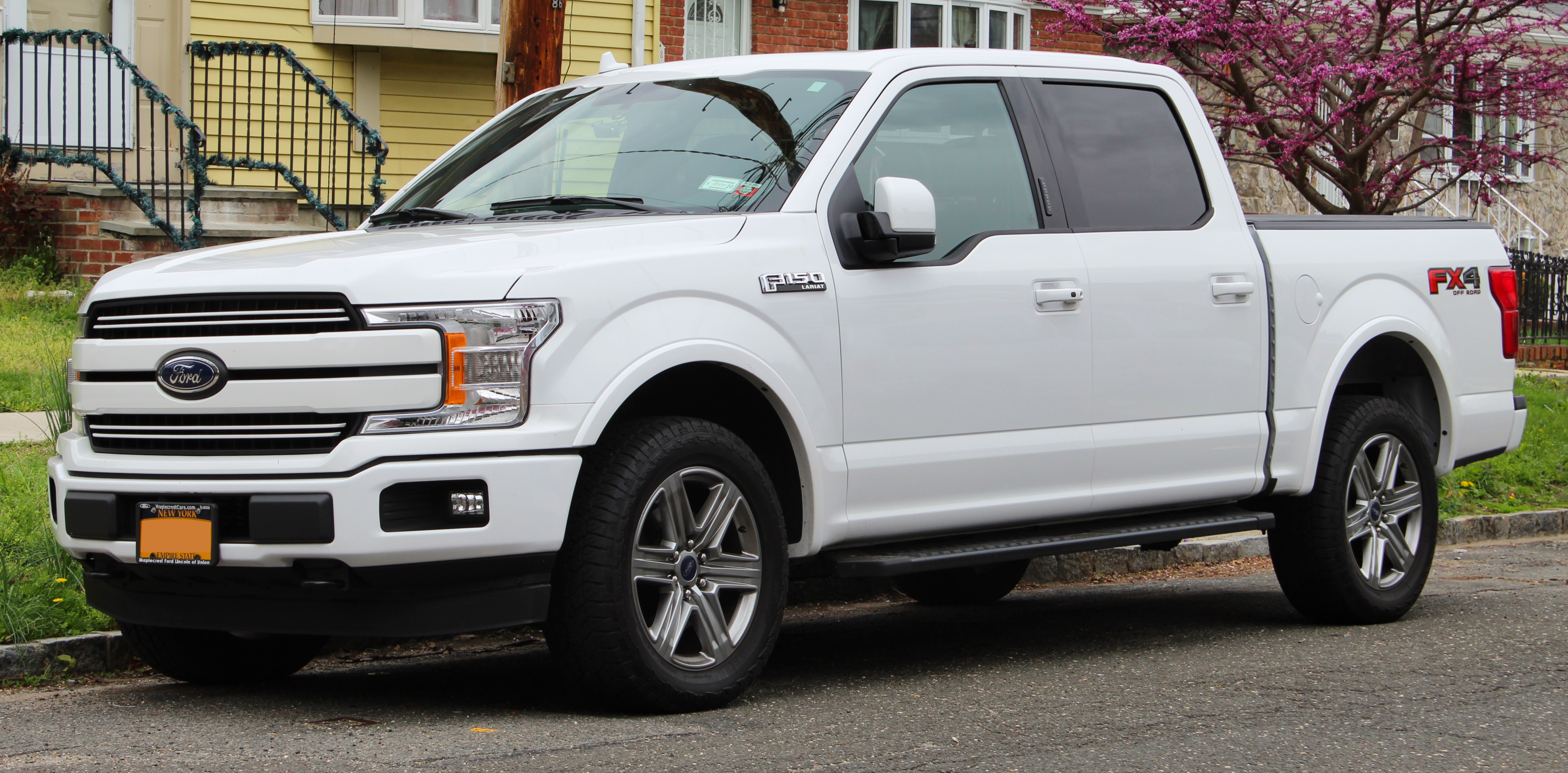
Ford F-150 / Lobo (P552)

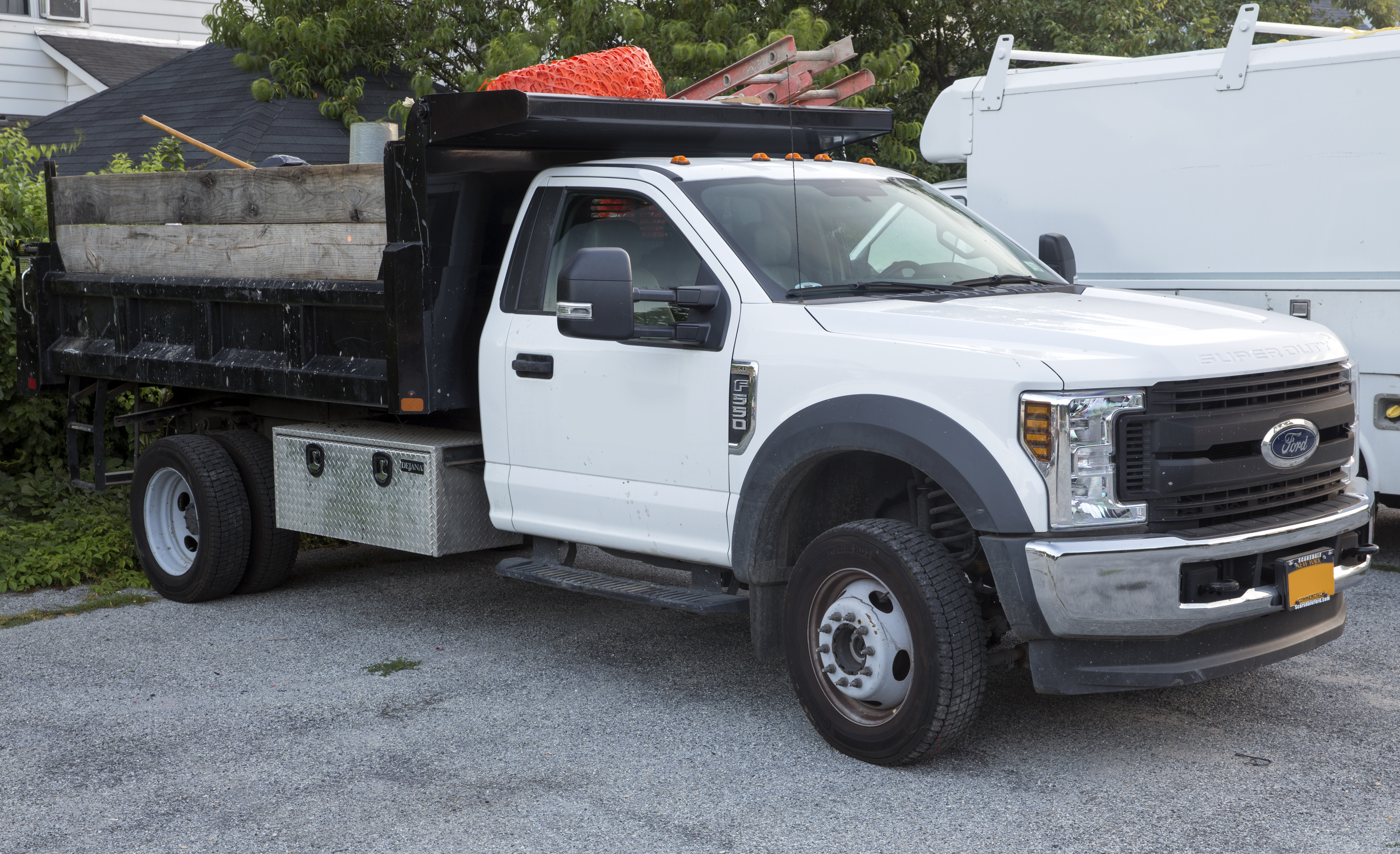
Ford Super Duty (P558)

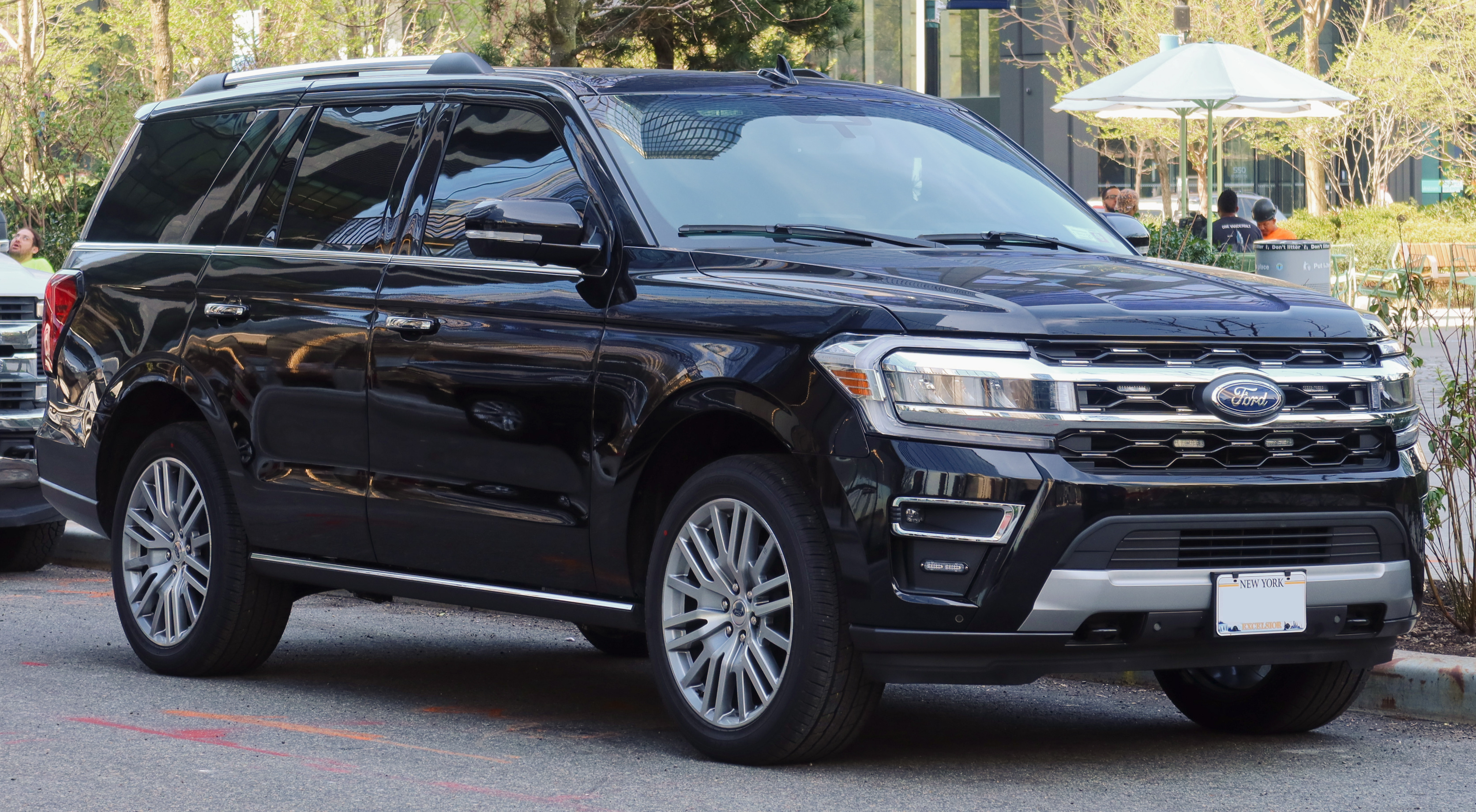
Ford Expedition / Expedition Max (U553)

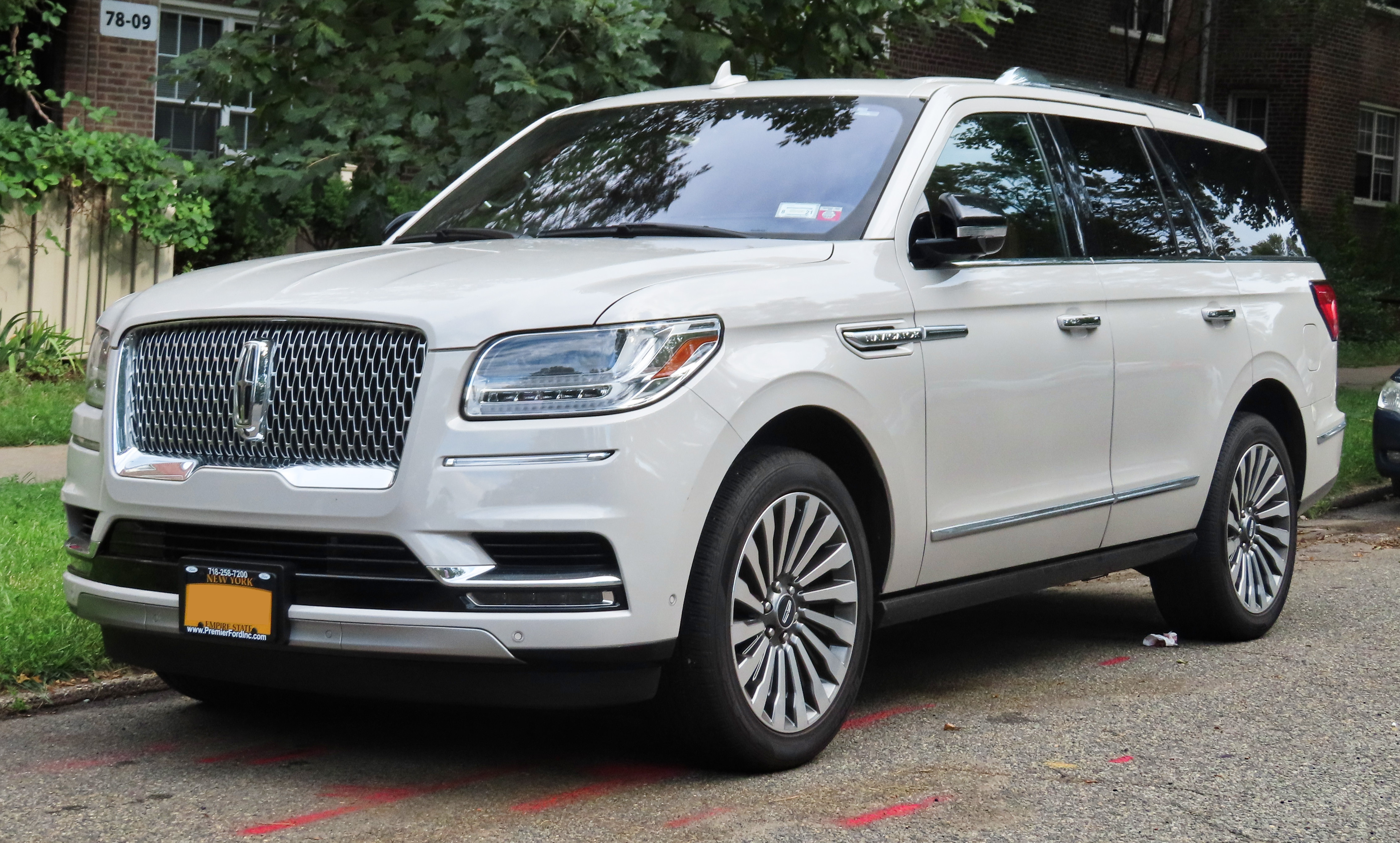
Lincoln Navigator / Navigator L (U554)

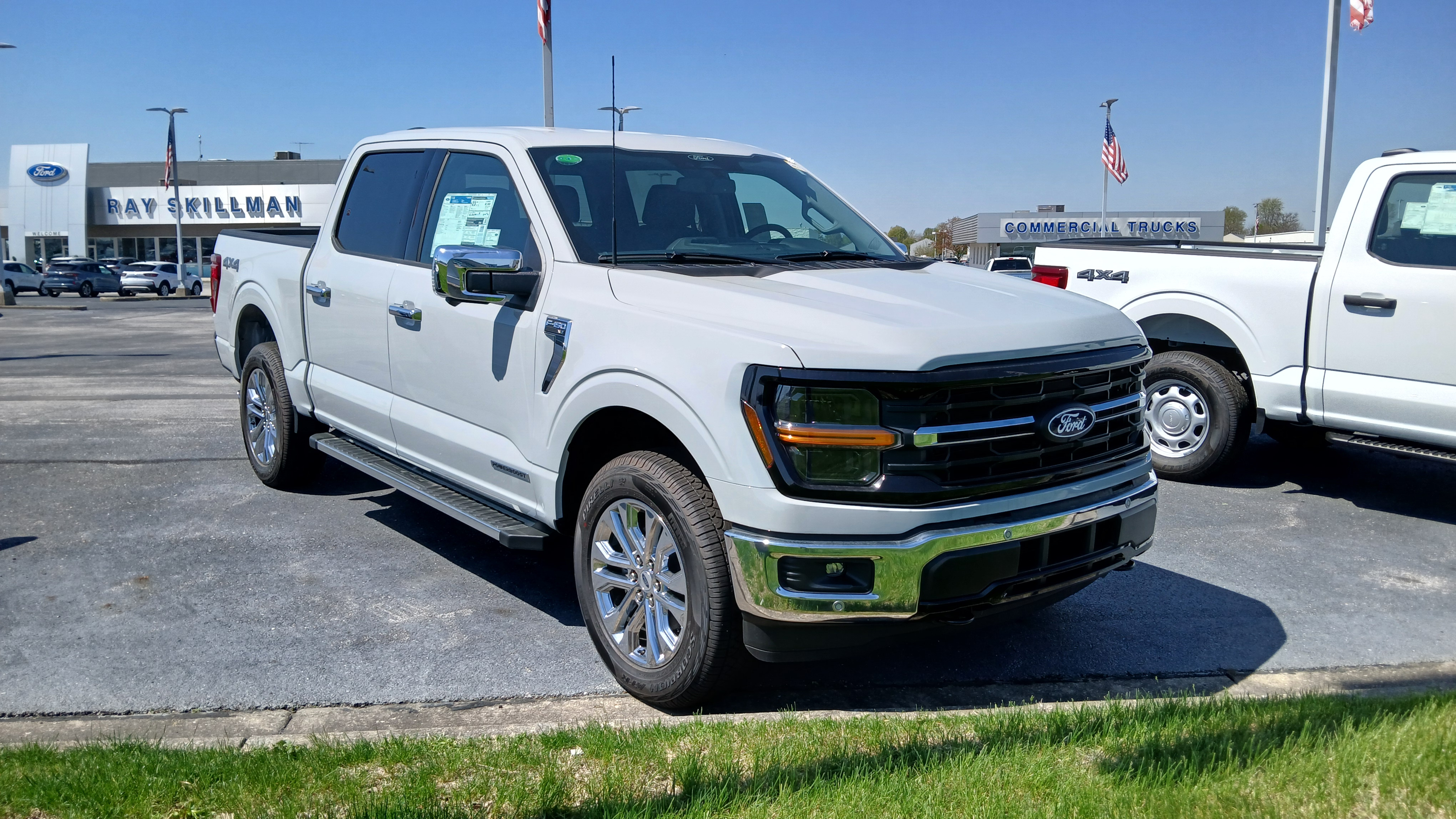
Ford F-150 / Lobo (P702)

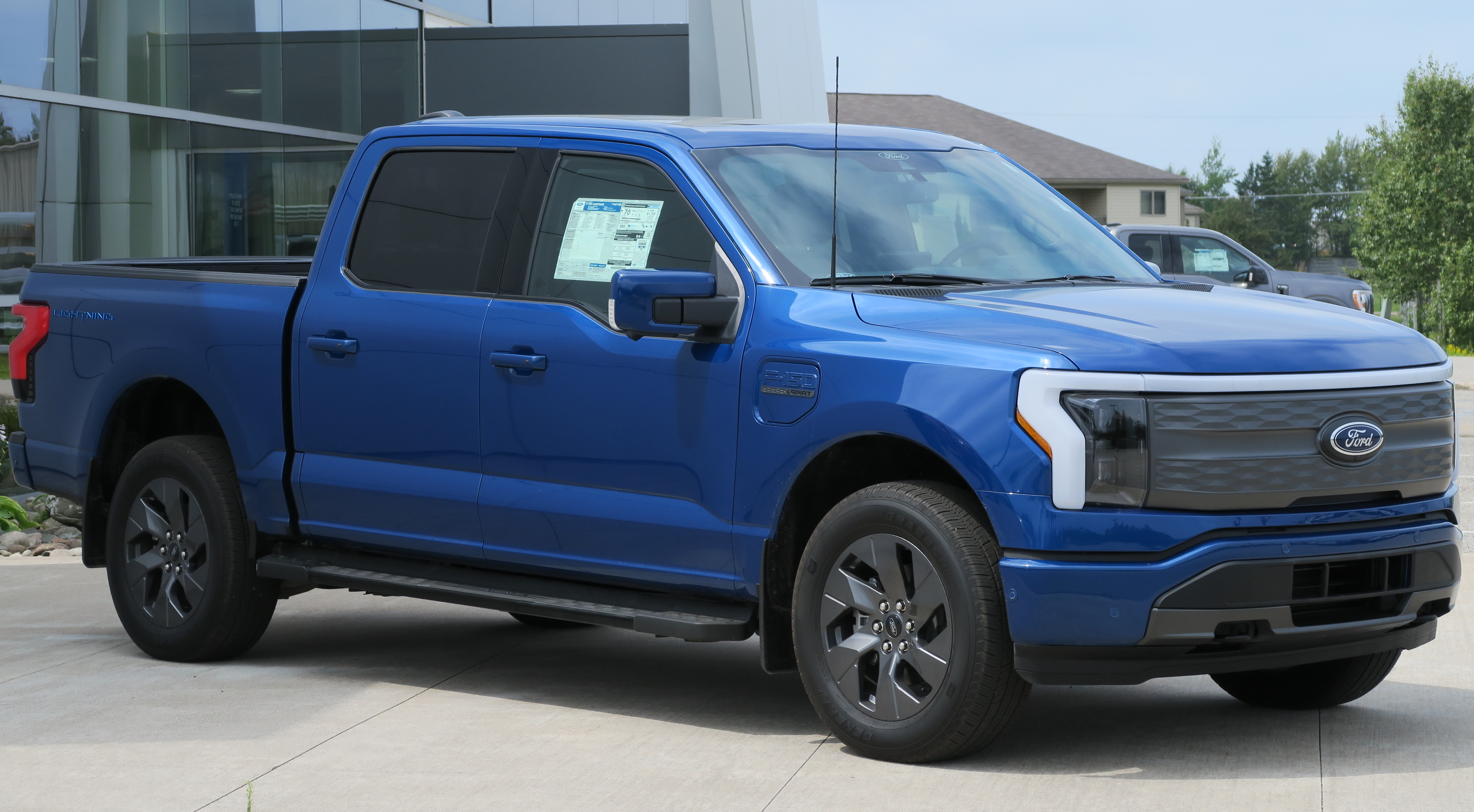
Ford F-150 Lightning (P702)

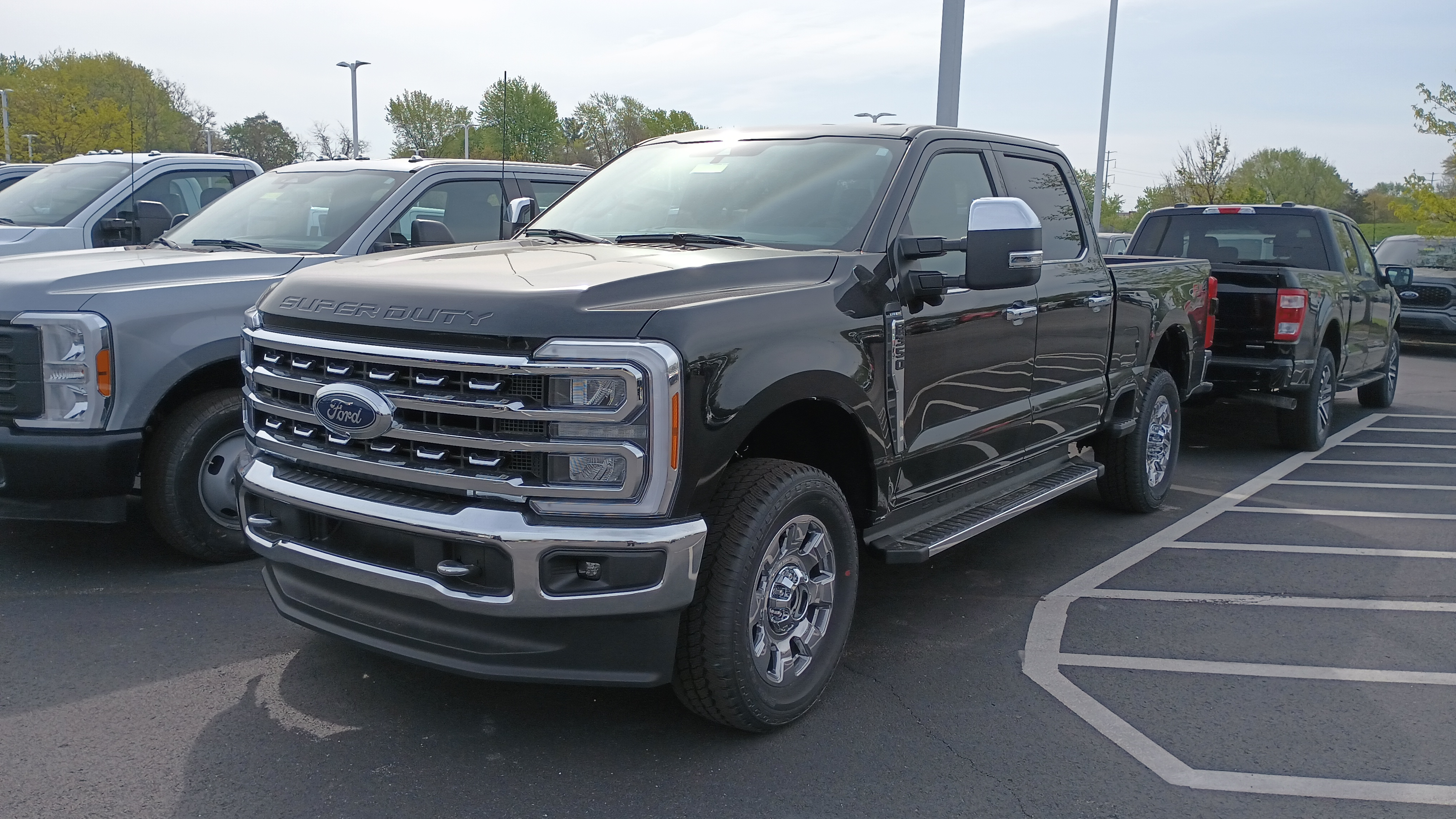
Ford Super Duty (P708)

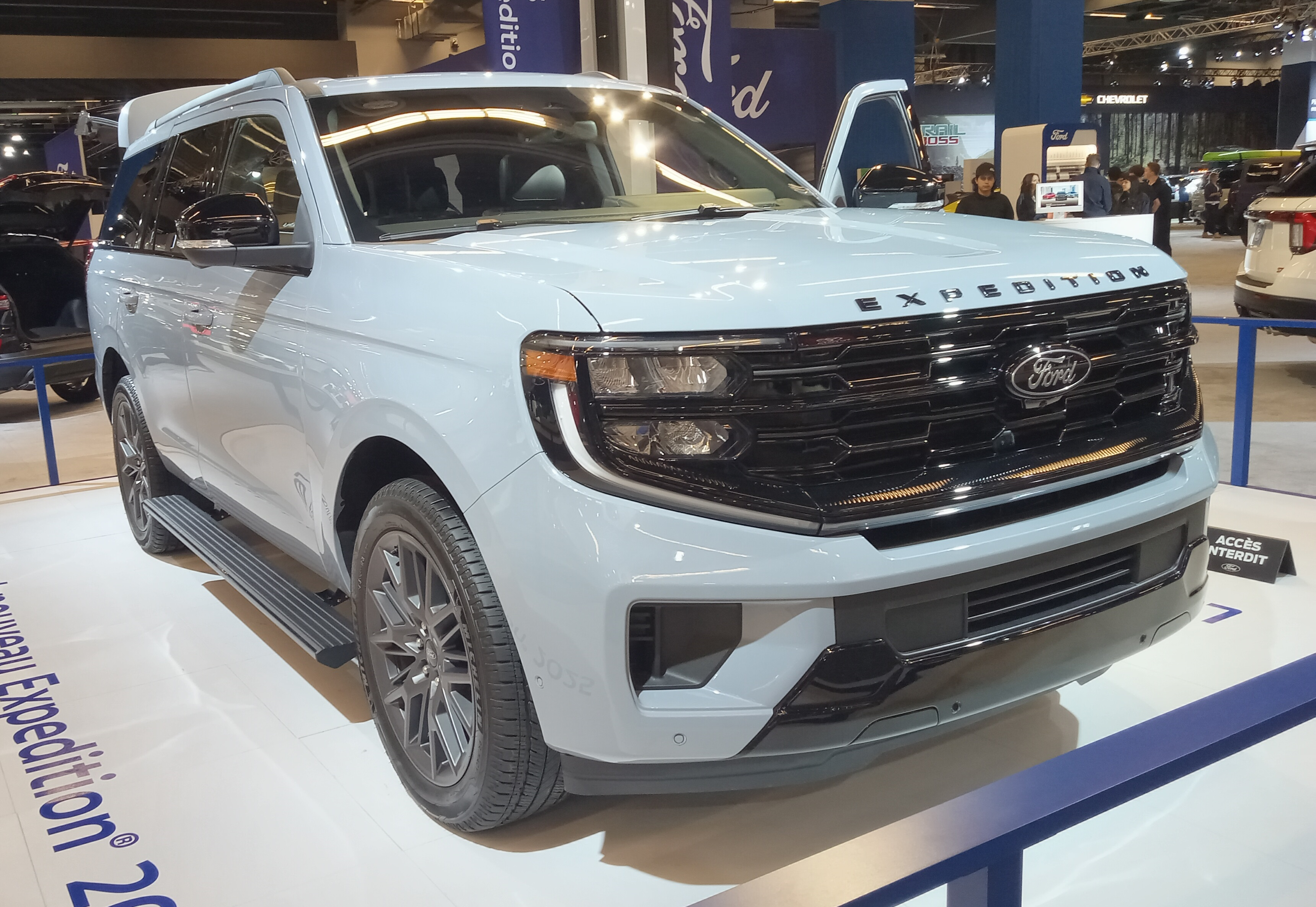
Ford Expedition / Expedition Max (U703)

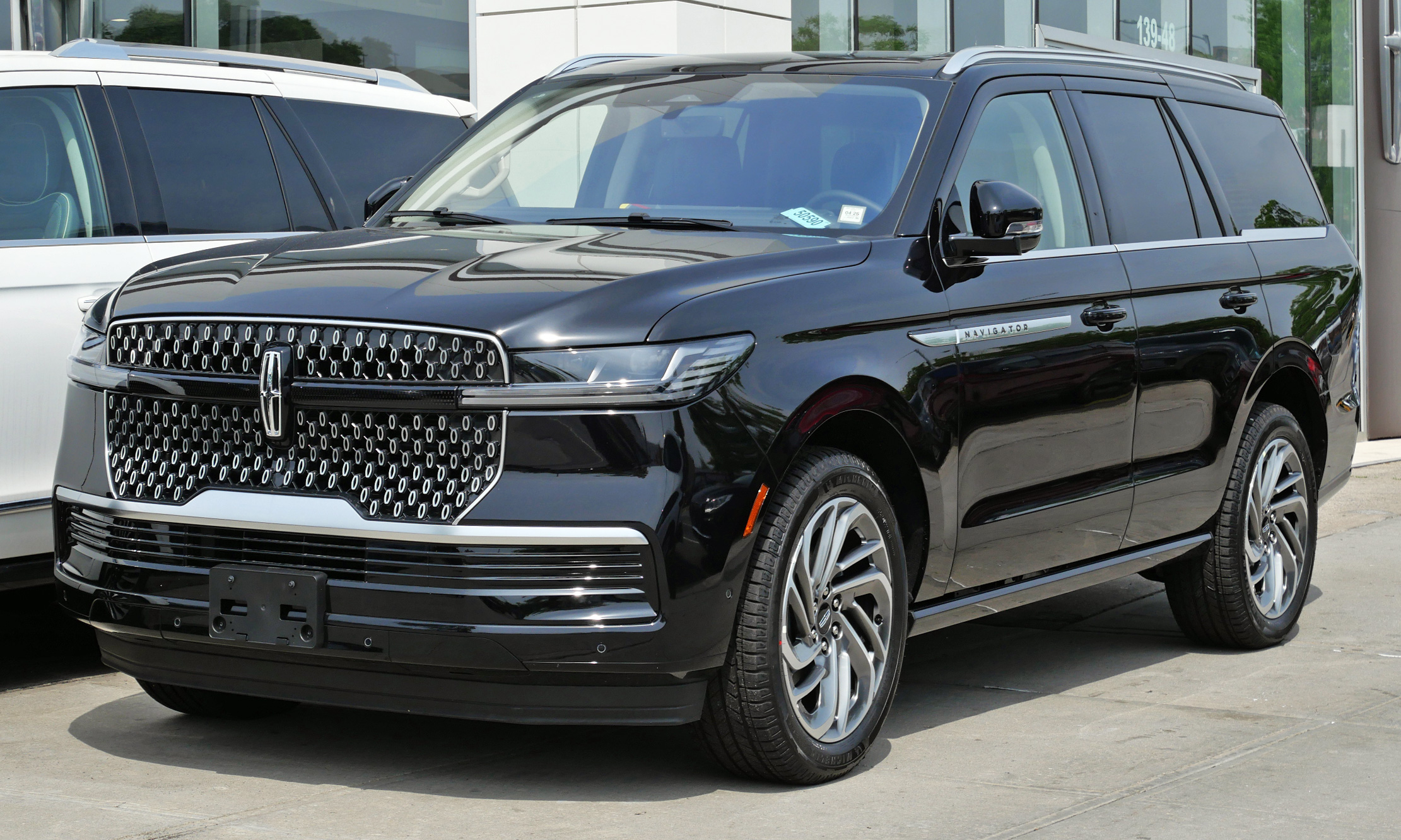
Lincoln Navigator / Navigator L (U704)

== T5 ==
The T5 platform is what Land Rover calls an Integrated Body Frame, which joins both a monocoque section for the engine bay and passenger compartment, and a ladder frame section for the gearbox and suspension. Compared to the all unibody 2001 Range Rover, the heavier frame construction was chosen for lower costs, with the intent to use it on a new redesigned Defender and various other models, but many of these plans did not transpire.

- 2004–2009 Land Rover Discovery 3 / Land Rover LR3 (L319) - Use of the 2002 Ford Explorer's chassis was considered, but ruled out over unfavourable off-road clearances.
- 2006–2013 Range Rover Sport (L320)
- 2010–2016 Land Rover Discovery 4 / Land Rover LR4 (L319)
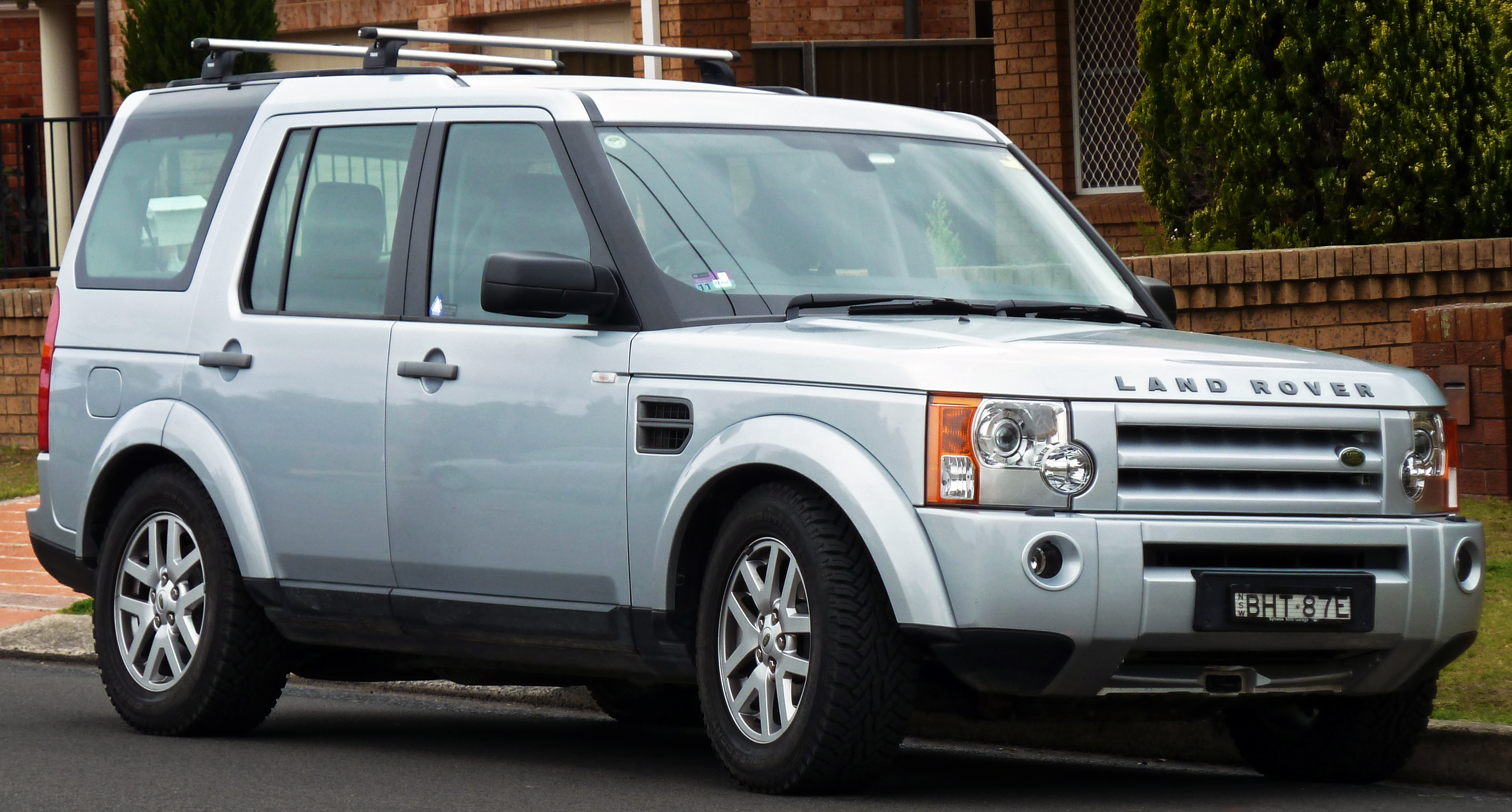
Land Rover Discovery 3 / LR3 (L319)

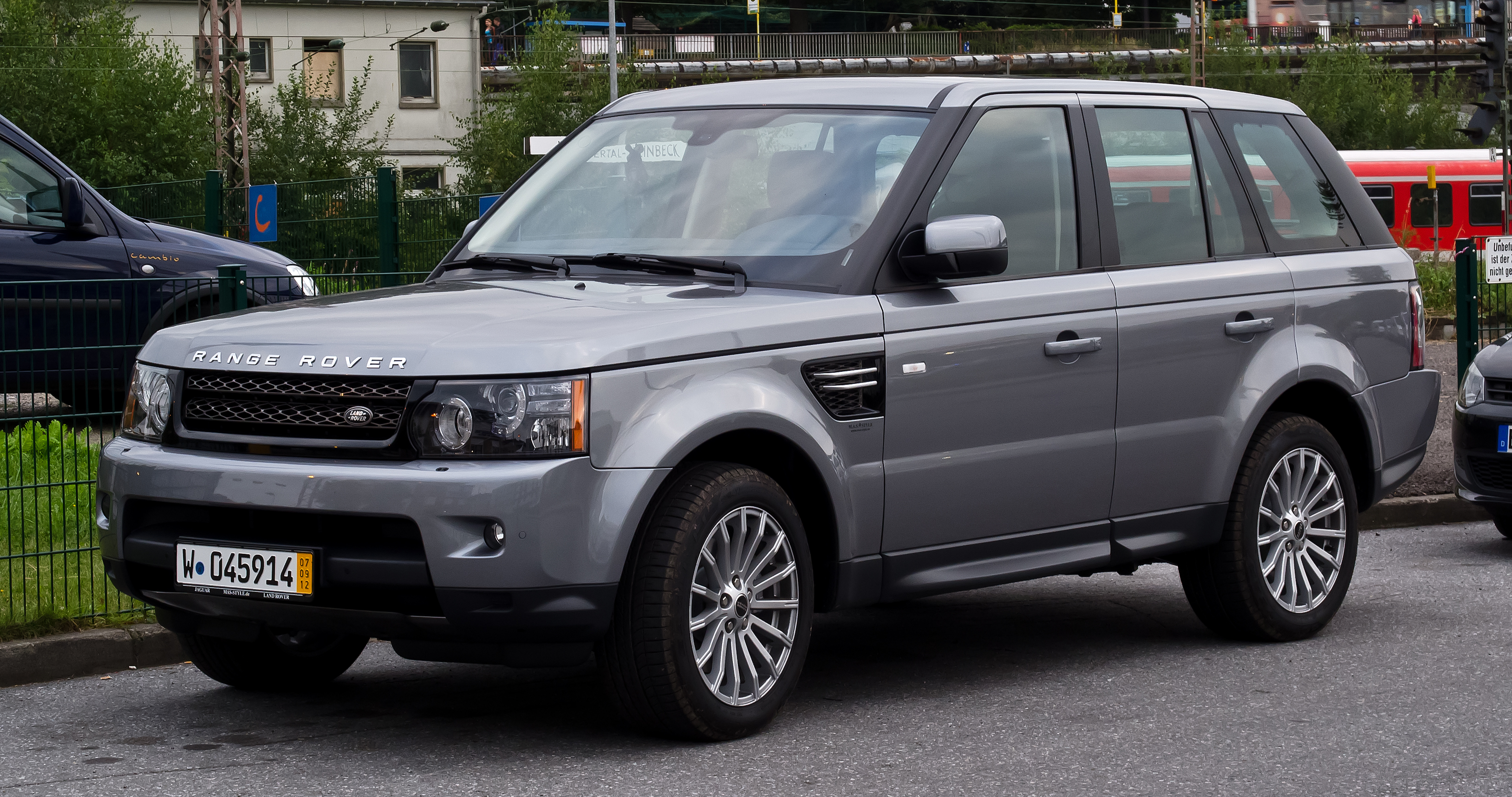
Range Rover Sport (L320)

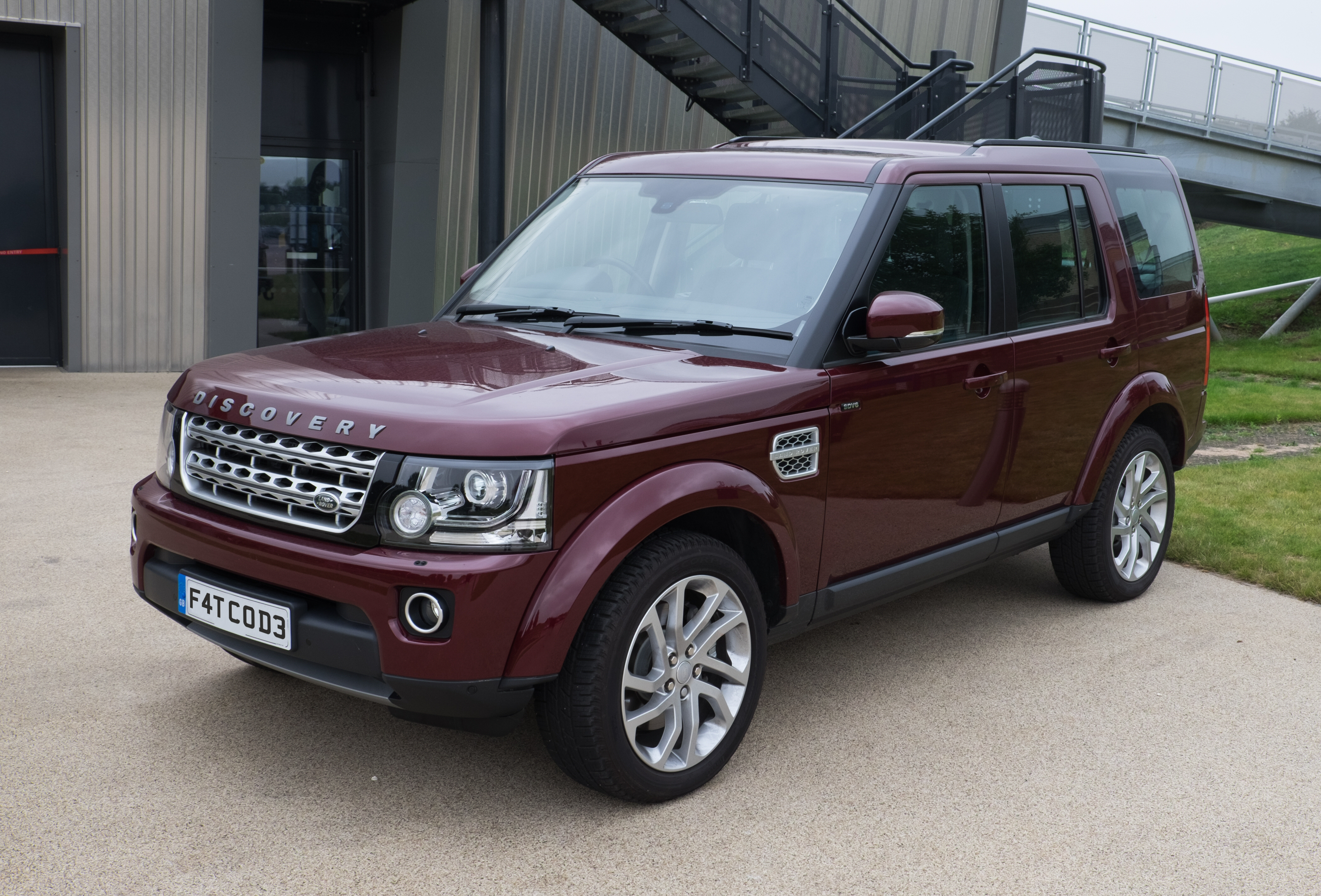
Land Rover Discovery 4 / LR4 (L319)

Cancelled models:

- Land Rover Defender (L317)
- Ford Explorer - Cancelled replacement.
- Ford Bronco - Rejected for T6 platform (as U260) when T5 was considered too costly, before being cancelled altogether.

== T6 ==
The T6 is the smallest of the new T platforms, designed for midsize trucks and SUVs.

Applications:

- 2011–2023 Ford Ranger (P375)
- 2015–2022 Ford Everest (U375)
- 2011–2020 Mazda BT-50 (UP, UR)
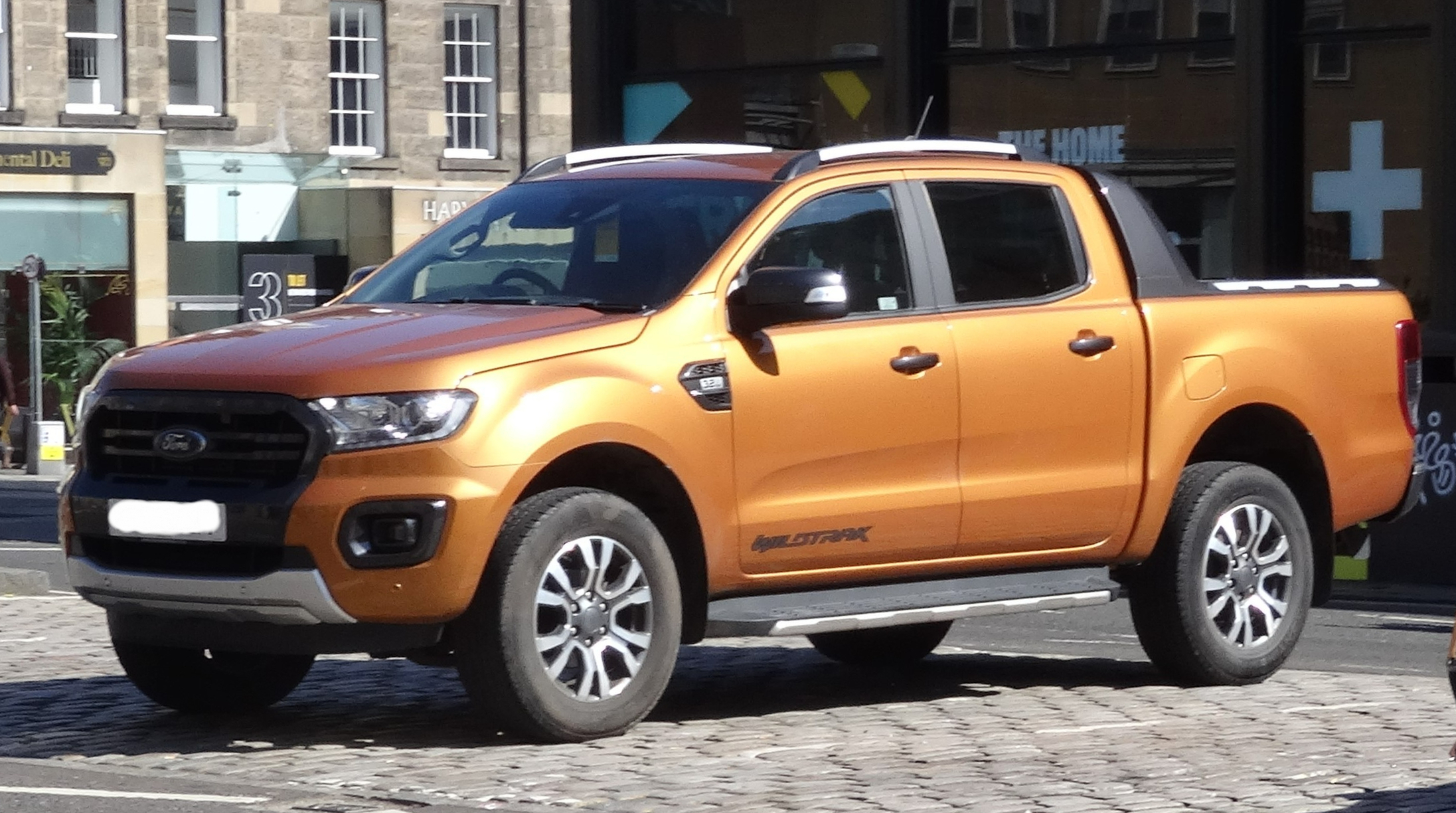
Ford Ranger (P375)

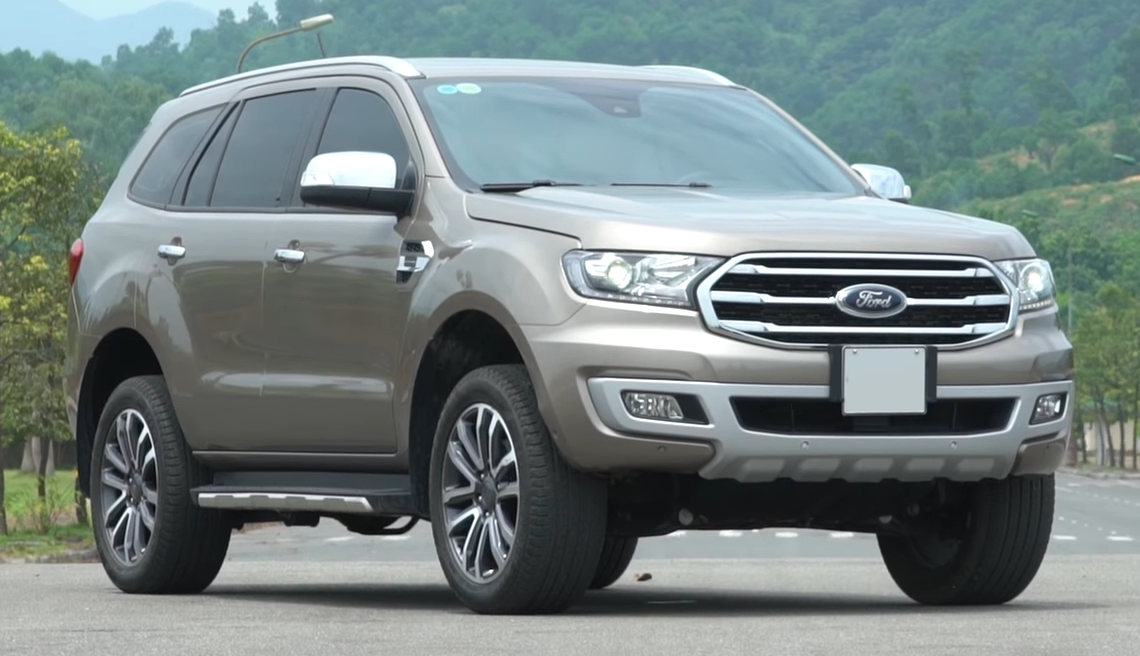
Ford Everest (U375)

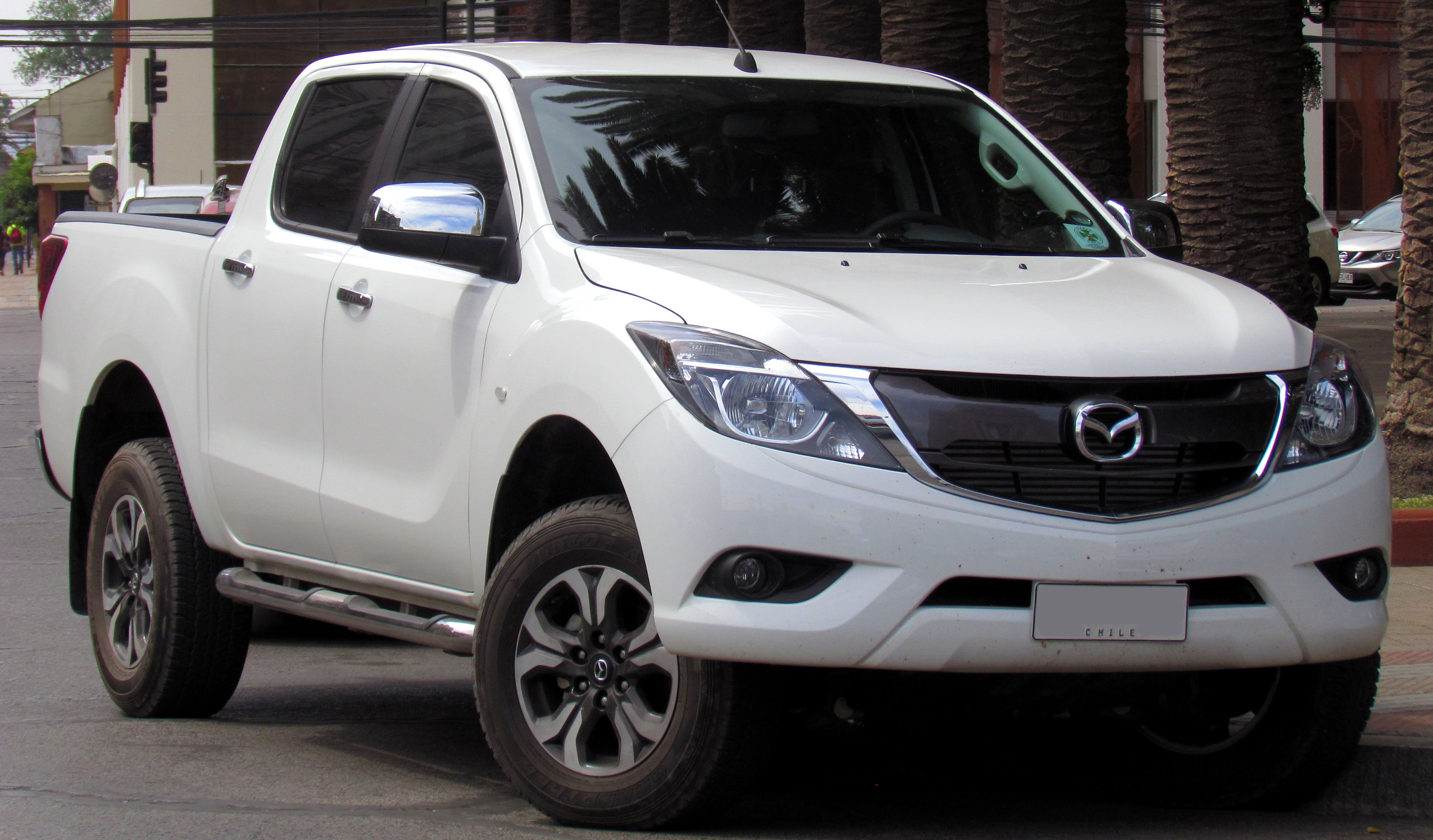
Mazda BT-50 (UP, UR)

T6.2

- 2021–present Ford Bronco (U725)
- 2022–present Ford Ranger (P703)
- 2022–present Ford Everest (U704)
- 2022–present Volkswagen Amarok (J73)
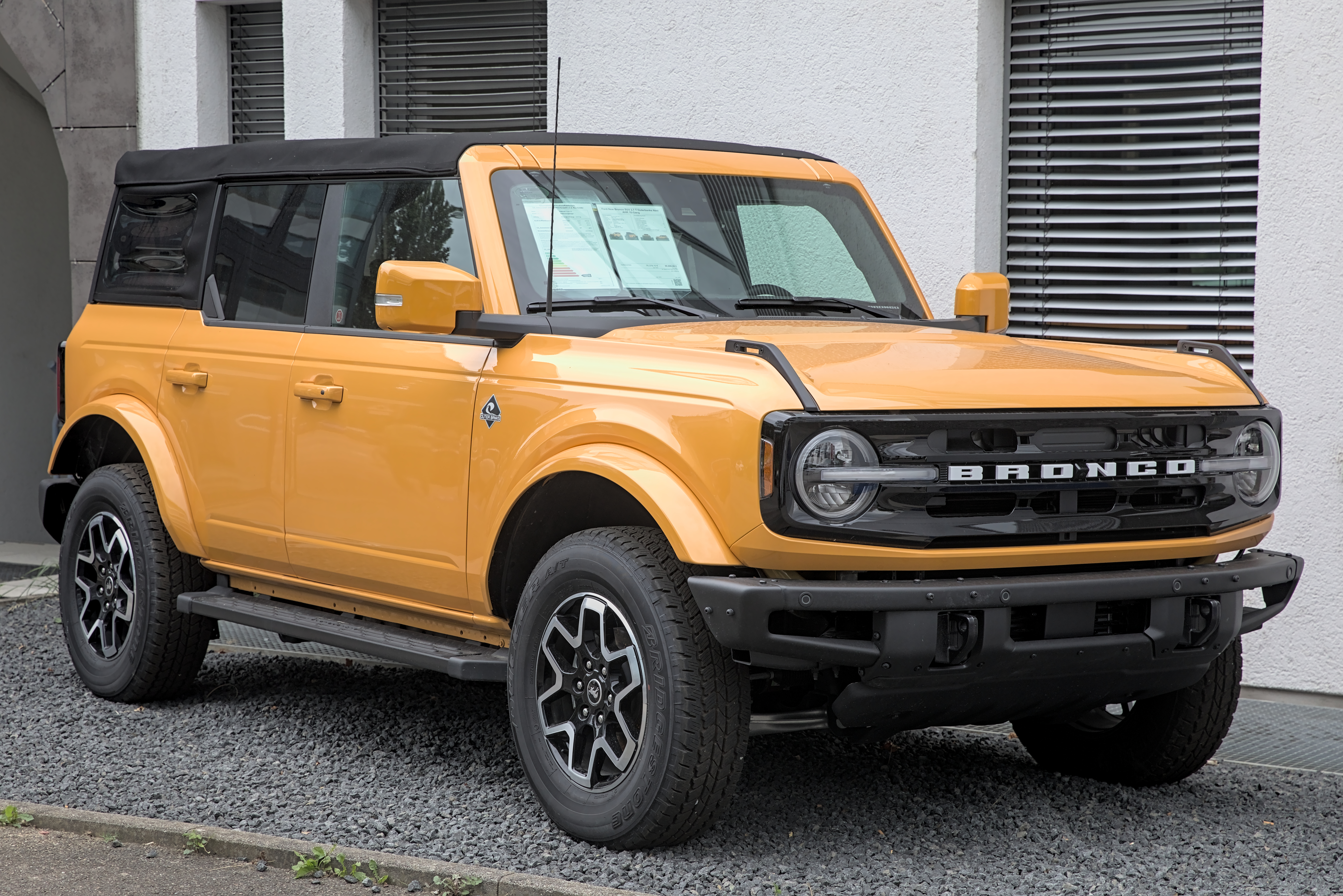
Ford Bronco (U725)

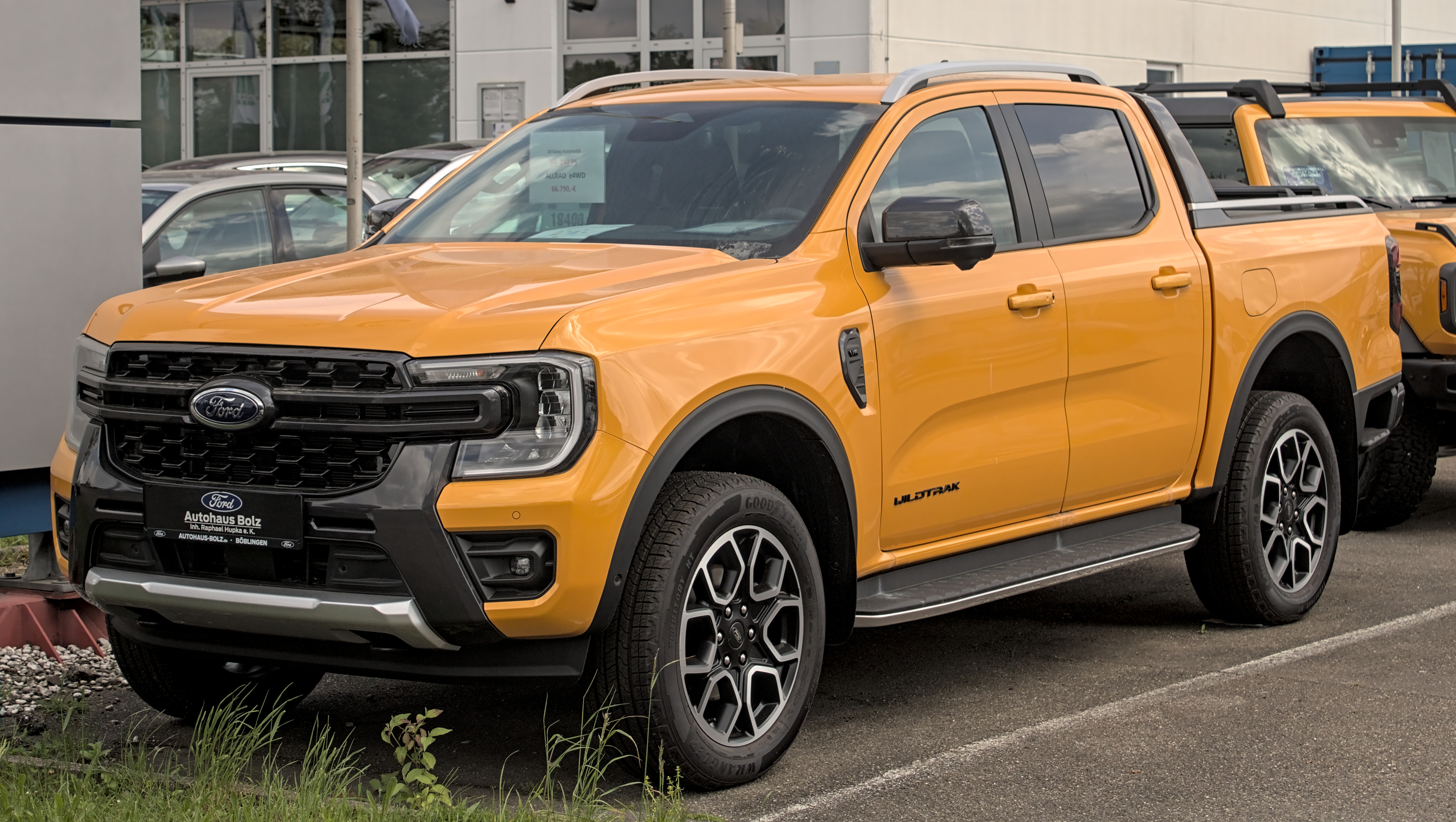
Ford Ranger (P703)

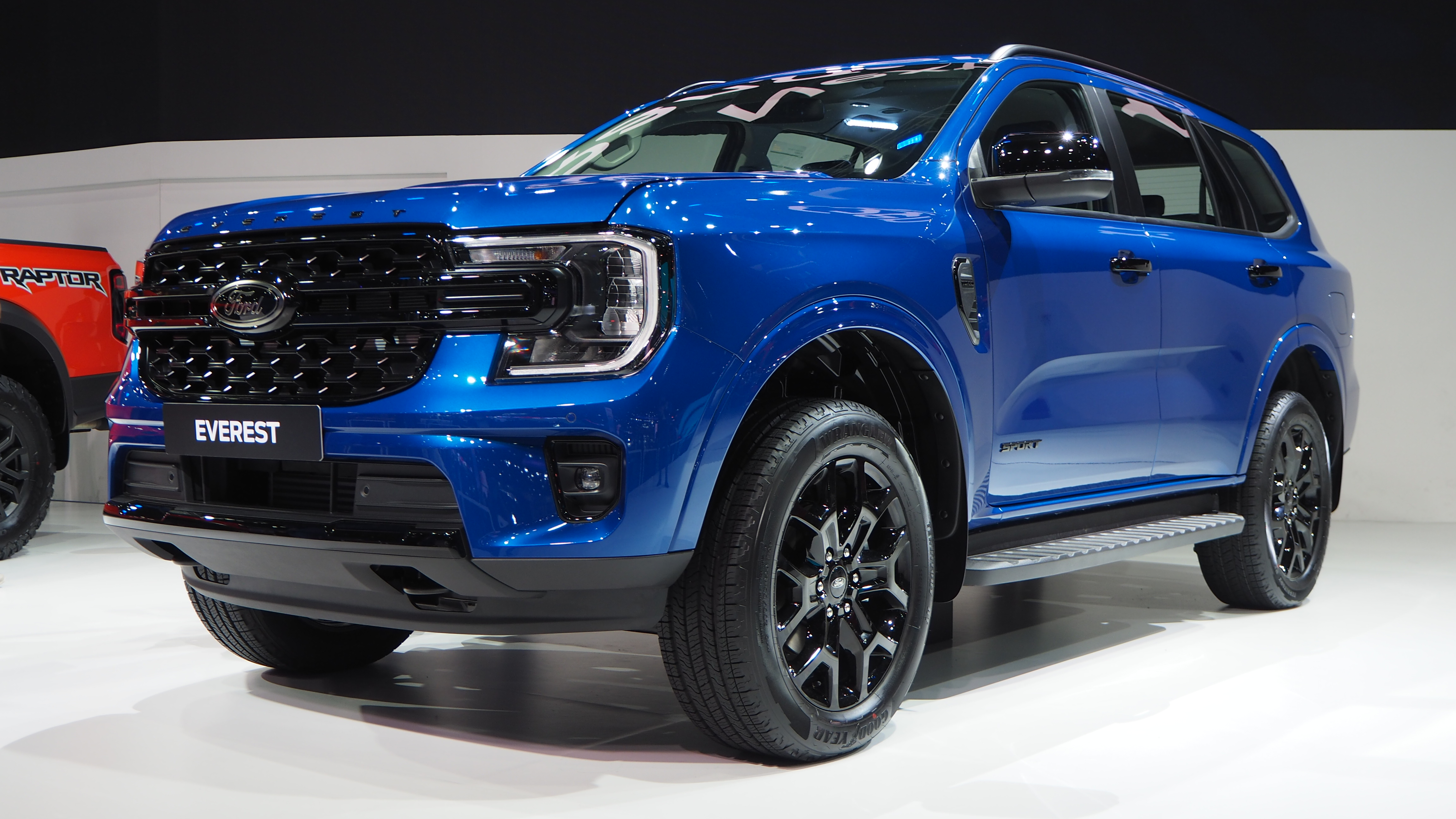
Ford Everest (U704)

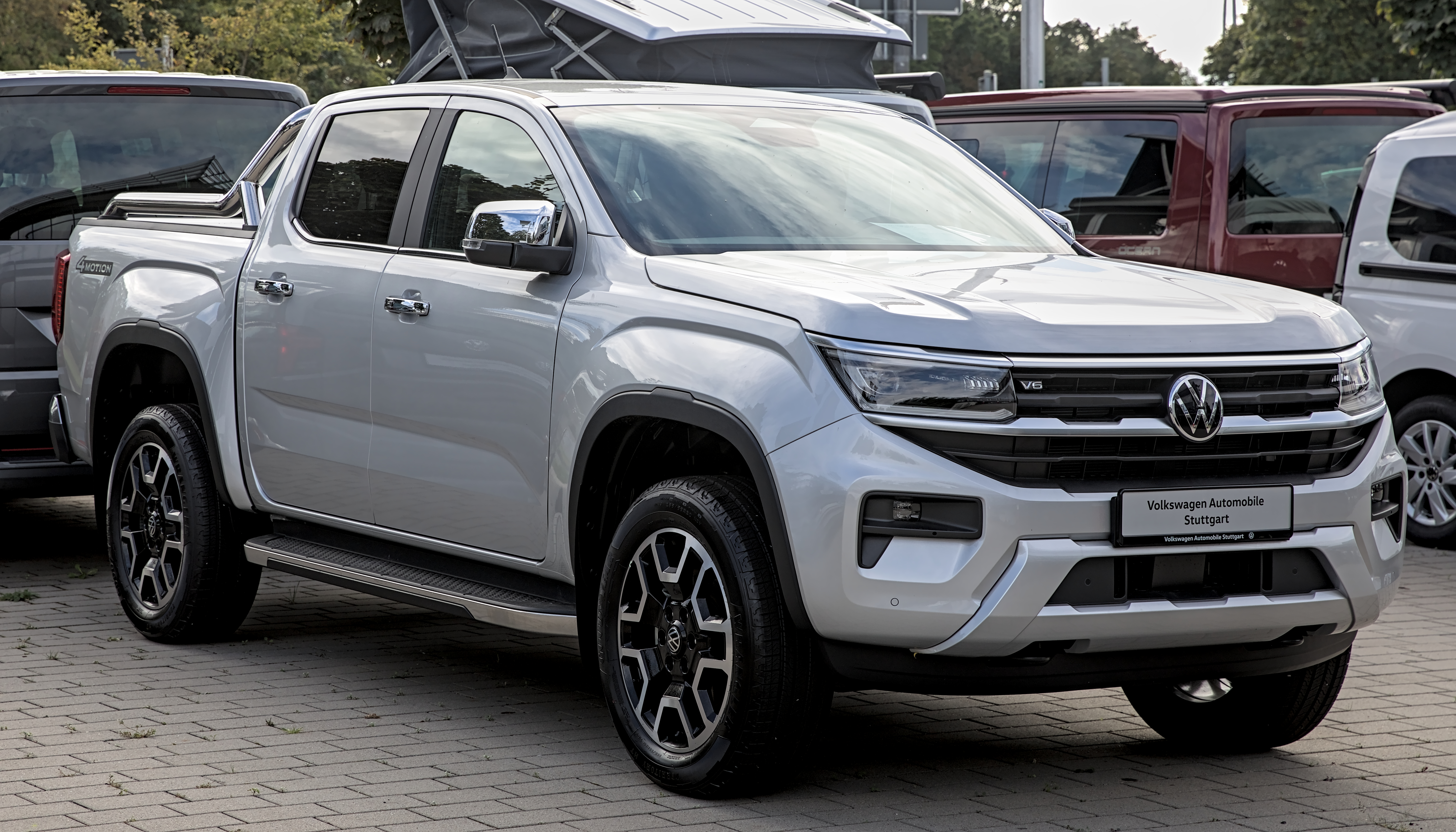
Volkswagen Amarok (J73)
