= AP NM AE T1 mine =

Brazilian anti-personnel mine

The Min AP NM AE T1 (Mina Anti-Pessoal Não-Magnética Auto Explosiva modelo T1) is a small Brazilian minimum metal anti-personnel mine. The mine has a plastic case in the form of a truncated cone. with a small protruding fuse and pressure plate. The small size of the pressure plate gives the mine some blast resistance. The main charge is in the form of a small inverted cone which generates a shaped charge effect when detonated.

The mines is armed by removal of a small safety pin, after which pressure on the small pressure plate compresses a small spring, which releases two small safety detents, releasing the striker to be forced into a percussion cap, triggering the booster charge and then the main charge.

The mine was produced until 1989 by Quimica Tupan Ltda in Brazil, and was in service with the country's armed forces. All operational stocks of the mine have been destroyed.

== Specifications ==
- Diameter: 85 mm
- Height: 95 mm
- Weight: 0.42 kg
- Explosive content: 0.15 kg of PETN/TNT with a Nitropenta booster charge.
- Operating pressure: 17 kg
