= Trillian =

Trillian may refer to:

- Trillian (character), a fictional character in The Hitchhiker's Guide to the Galaxy
- Trillian (software), an instant messaging application
- Project Trillian, an effort to port the Linux kernel to the Itanium processor

== See also ==
- Trillion (disambiguation)
