= Kerlaz =

Kerlaz Kerlaz
- Commune
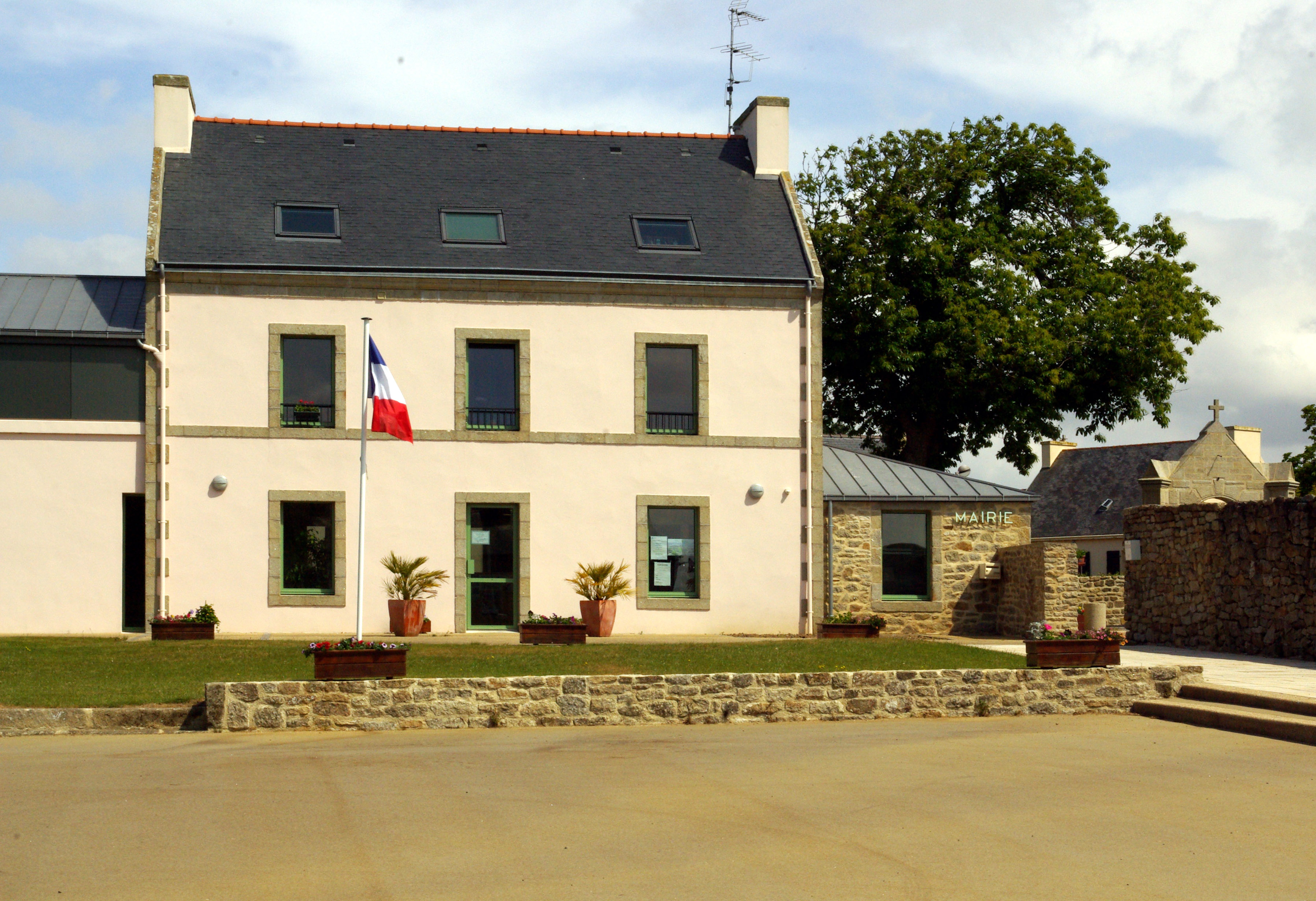
- The town hall in Kerlaz

- Coat of arms
- Location of Kerlaz
- Location within France Location within Brittany
- Coordinates: 48°05′34″N 4°16′21″W
- Country: France
- Region: Brittany
- Department: Finistère
- Arrondissement: Quimper
- Canton: Douarnenez

Government
  - Mayor (2020–2026): Marie-Thérèse Hernandez
- Area^{1}: 11.44 km^{2} (4.42 sq mi)
- Highest elevation: 137 m (449 ft)
- Lowest elevation: 2 m (6.6 ft)
- Population (2023): 805
  - Density: 70.4/km^{2} (182/sq mi)
- Time zone: UTC+01:00 (CET)
  - Summer (DST): UTC+02:00 (CEST)
- INSEE/Postal code: 29090 /29100
- ^{1} French Land Register data, which excludes lakes, ponds, glaciers > 1 km^{2} (0.386 sq mi or 247 acres) and river estuaries.

Kerlaz (French pronunciation: [kɛʁlaz]; Breton: Kerlaz) is a commune in the Finistère department of Brittany in northwestern France. It extends over an area of 11.39 km^{2}. In 2023 the commune had 805 inhabitants.

== Population ==
Inhabitants of Kerlaz are called in French Kerlaziens.

== See also ==
- Communes of the Finistère department
