= AC NM AE T1 mine =

Brazilian anti-tank blast mine

The AC NM AE T1 (Mina Anti-Carro Não-Magnética Auto Explosiva modelo T1) is a Brazilian minimum metal anti-tank blast mine. The mine is believed to be in service with the Brazilian army, although production of the mine ceased in 1989. The mine has a square plastic main body, with a raised circular pressure plate and fuze. A carry handle is built into one side of the mine. It appears to be very similar to the PRB M3.

The mine is reportedly used in Ecuador, Peru and Libya.

== Specifications ==
- Length: 225 mm
- Width: 255 mm
- Height: 155 mm
- Weight: 8 kg
- Explosive content: 7 kg of TNT with a Pentolite booster (a 50:50 PETN/TNT mix)
- Operating pressure: 60 to 140 kg
