= T1 (album) =

2018 studio album by Tatianna

Studio album by Tatianna
- Released: May 28, 2018

T1 is the debut studio album by American drag queen and musician Tatianna, released on May 28, 2018.

== Singles ==
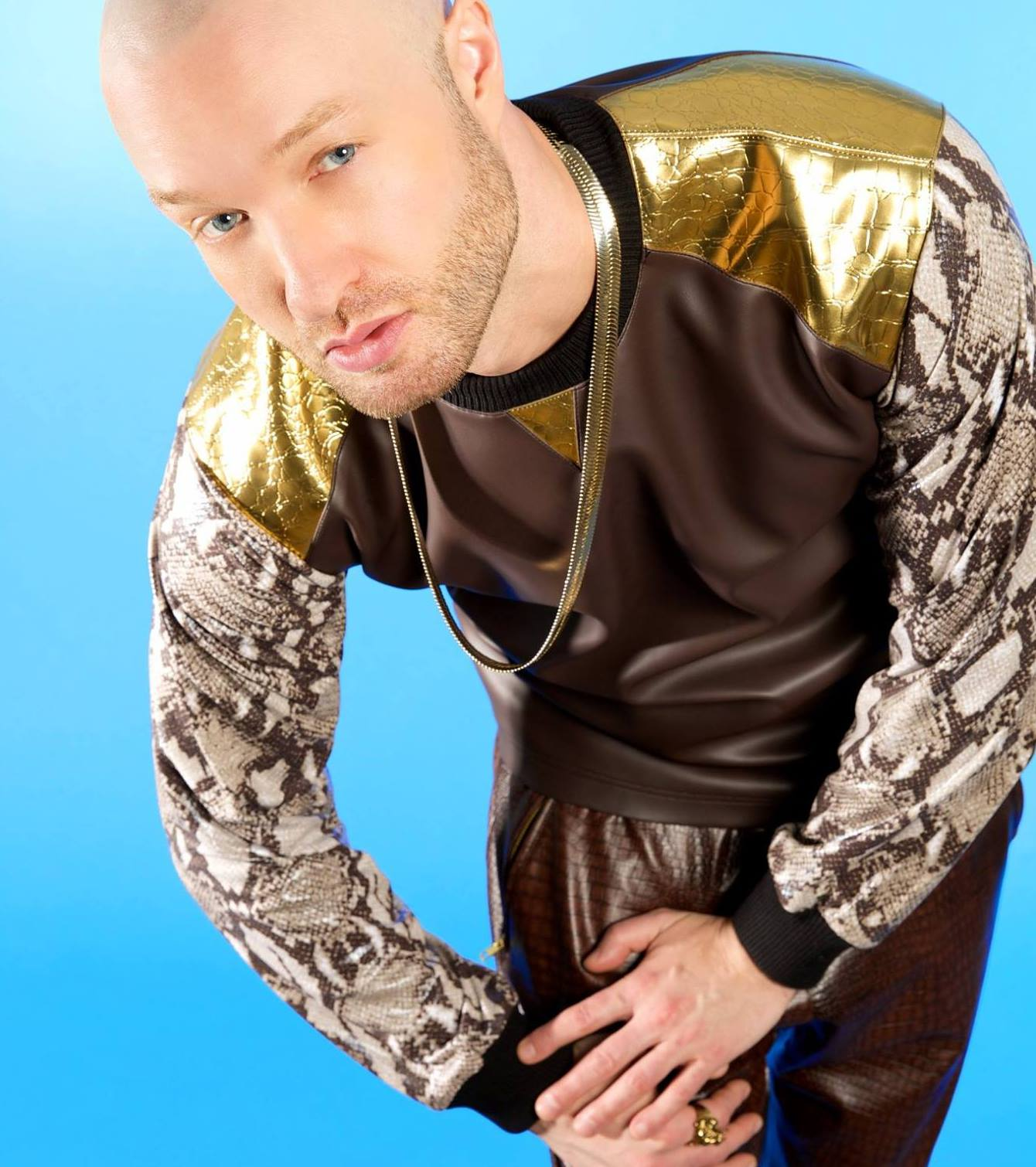
Cazwell

The album features Cazwell on "Shut It Down" and Salvadora Dali on "Try", which were released as singles. "Cya" served as the album's third single.

== Reception ==
Stephen Daw of Billboard wrote, "Ranging from similar beat-heavy dance tracks to slowed down, moody R&B ballads, T1 differentiates itself from the countless other albums that have been produced by queens from the show" (referring to the reality show RuPaul's Drag Race on which Tatianna had appeared as a contestant). Daniel Megarry of Gay Times said the album "sees her serve club-ready beats, fierce lyrics, and of course the odd spoken word segment".

== Track listing ==
1. "I Know"
2. "Try" (feat. Salvadora Dali)
3. "Use Me"
4. "Shut It Down" (feat. Cazwell)
5. "Cya"
6. "Kitty Kat"
7. "Almost Maybe"
8. "Tell Me"
9. "The Fantasy"
10. "Never Be"
11. "Keep It Movin"
