= Domine =

Domine is vocative of the Latin for "Lord!"

Domine may also refer to:

== People ==
- Marc-Edmond Dominé (1848–1921), French Army colonel
- Domine Banyankimbona (born 1970), Minister of Public Service, Labour and Employment of Burundi
- Domine Lomovšek (born 1954), former Yugoslav ice hockey goaltender
- Domine (clergyman), an old English term for a parson

== Other uses ==
- Domine (fish), a tropical fish species
- Domine (band), an Italian power metal band started in the mid-1980s
- Domine Database, a biological database

== See also ==
- French sloop Commandant Dominé, a minesweeper that served in World War II
- Dominie (disambiguation)
- Dominy, a list of people with the surname
