= Christine Vogel =

German-American molecular biologist

- Education: University College London; University of Cambridge; Max Planck Institute for Chemical Ecology
- Scientific career
- Workplaces: New York University; University of Texas at Austin
- Doctoral advisor: Cyrus Chothia

Christine Vogel is a German-American molecular biologist who is an associate professor at the New York University. Her research considers quantitative proteomics. She is particularly interested in protein expression patterns and how these are related to human disease.

== Early life and education ==
Vogel is from Germany. She was awarded the German National Merit Foundation award, and earned her master's degree at the Max Planck Institute for Chemical Ecology. Vogel moved to University College London for a second master's in mathematical biology. She left London for Cambridge for her doctoral research, where she specialized in computational biology in the laboratory of Cyrus Chothia. In 2005 Vogel was appointed a postdoctoral researcher at the University of Texas at Austin.

== Research and career ==
Vogel was appointed as an assistant professor at the New York University in 2011. Vogel has studied the mechanisms involved with protein signalling. The creation of proteins involve messenger RNA molecules from the genes encoded within DNA. Both the generation of RNA and formation of proteins are coupled to one another, akin to the coupling of a moving escalator with someone walking upon it. Vogel has shown that both processes, the generation of RNA and the arrangement of RNA into proteins, are important. She demonstrated that the process of generating RNA from DNA is pulsed-like: brief spikes of activity that relax to a ground state, whereas the creation of proteins was more like an on-off switch.

Vogel is interested in how genes respond to different stressors and how certain environmental conditions can give rise to mutations such as cancer. Amongst these genes, Vogel has studied BRCA1, which, if functioning properly, can prevent cells from dividing or growing. Mutations on the BRCA1 means that damage to DNA cannot be repaired, such that cells mutate and cause cancer. Vogel believes that by understanding the pathways involved with these processes she will be able to design drugs to counter this BRCA1 mutation. In 2019, her laboratory was named a Pressure BioSciences Center for Excellence.

Vogel has served as an editor for PLoS Computational Biology.

== Awards ==
2017 US Human Proteome Organization Robert J. Cotter New Investigator Award

== Selected publications ==
- Vogel, Christine; Marcotte, Edward (2012). "Insights into the regulation of protein abundance from proteomic and transcriptomic analyses". Nature Reviews Genetics. 13 (4): 227–232. doi:10.1038/nrg3185. PMC 3654667. PMID 22411467. Wikidata Q36846022.
- Peng Lu; Vogel, Christine; Rong Wang; Xin Yao; Marcotte, Edward (2006). "Absolute protein expression profiling estimates the relative contributions of transcriptional and translational regulation". Nature Biotechnology. 25 (1): 117–124. doi:10.1038/nbt1270. PMID 17187058. Wikidata Q34594316.
- Raquel de Sousa Abreu; Luiz O Penalva; Marcotte, Edward; Vogel, Christine (2009). "Global signatures of protein and mRNA expression levels". Molecular Omics. 5 (12): 1512–1526. doi:10.1039/b908315d. PMC 4089977. PMID 20023718. Wikidata Q33874396.
