= Ribbon diagram =

3D schematic representation of protein structure

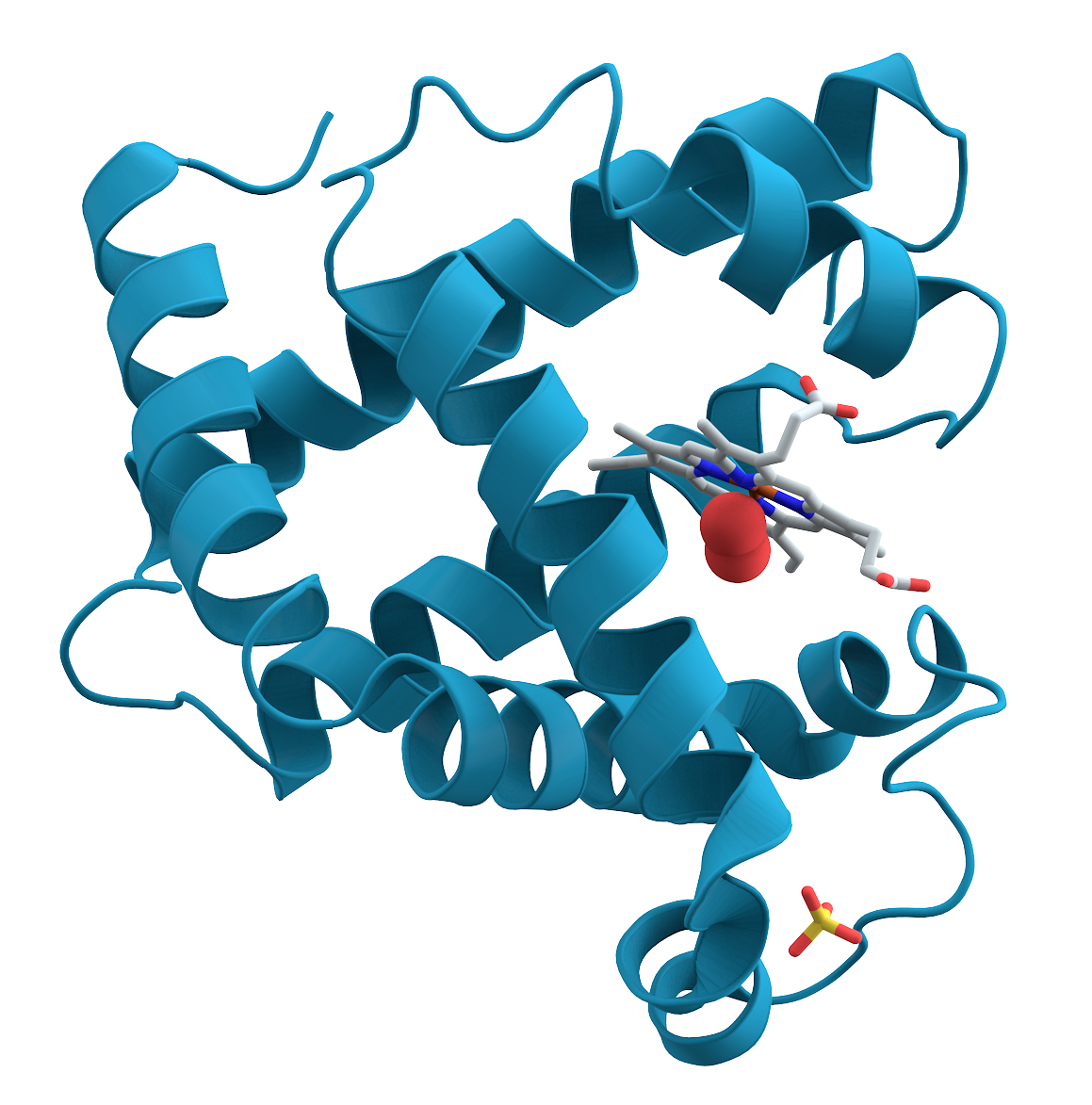
Ribbon diagram of myoglobin bound to haem (sticks) and oxygen (red spheres) (PDB: 1MBO)

Ribbon diagrams, also known as Richardson diagrams, are 3D schematic representations of protein structure and are one of the most common methods of protein depiction used today. The ribbon depicts the general course and organization of the protein backbone in 3D and serves as a visual framework for hanging details of the entire atomic structure, such as the balls for the oxygen atoms attached to myoglobin's active site in the adjacent figure. Ribbon diagrams are generated by interpolating a smooth curve through the polypeptide backbone. α-helices are shown as coiled ribbons or thick tubes, β-sheets as arrows, and non-repetitive coils or loops as lines or thin tubes. The direction of the polypeptide chain is shown locally by the arrows, and may be indicated overall by a colour ramp along the length of the ribbon.

Ribbon diagrams are simple yet powerful, expressing the visual basics of a molecular structure (twist, fold and unfold). This method has successfully portrayed the overall organization of protein structures, reflecting their three-dimensional nature and allowing better understanding of these complex objects both by expert structural biologists and by other scientists, students, and the general public.

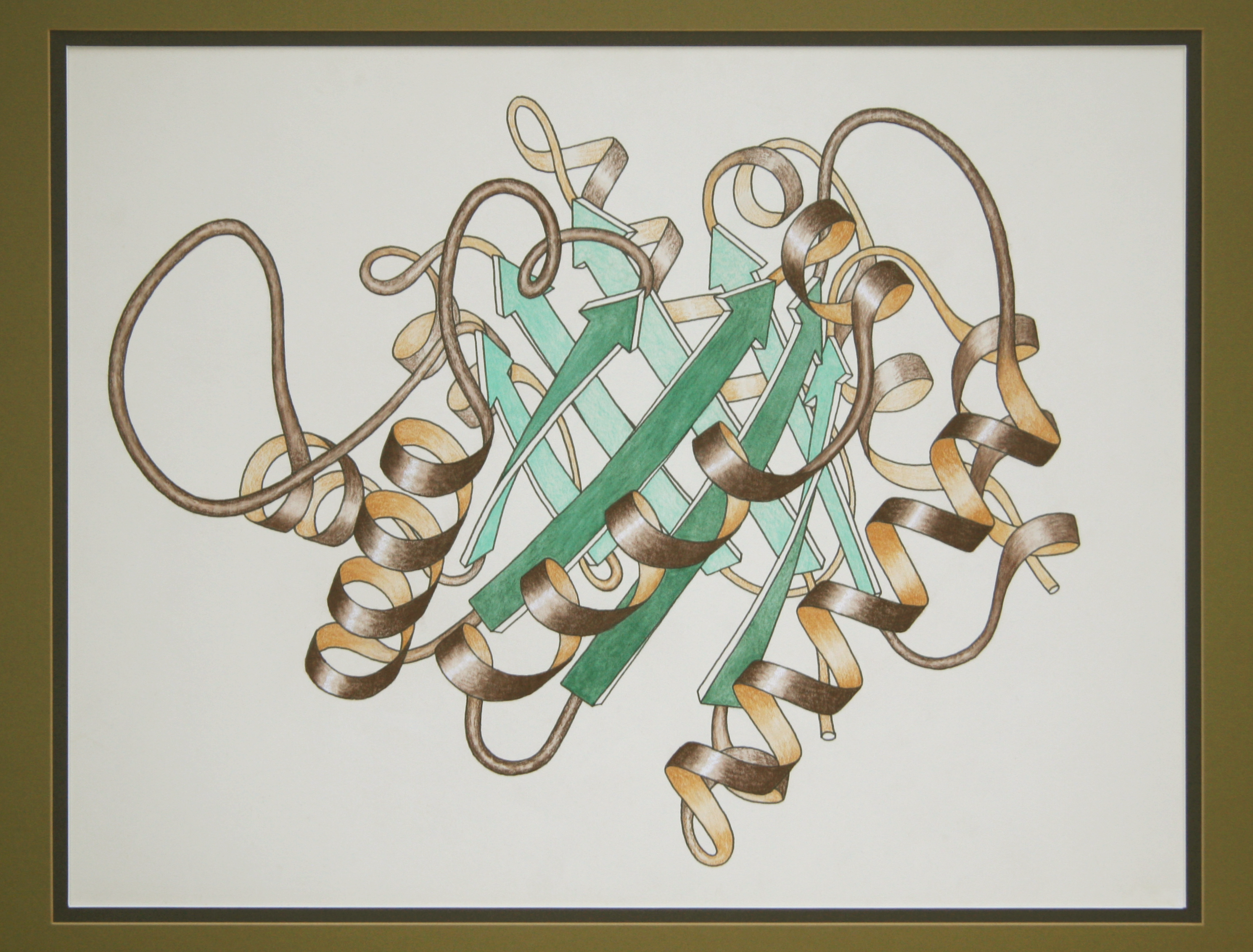
Ribbon schematic of triose P isomerase monomer (hand-drawn by J. Richardson, 1981) (PDB: 1TIM)

== History ==
The first ribbon diagrams, hand-drawn by Jane S. Richardson in 1980 (influenced by earlier individual illustrations), were the first schematics of 3D protein structure to be produced systematically. They were created to illustrate a classification of protein structures for an article in Advances in Protein Chemistry. These drawings were outlined in pen on tracing paper over a printout of a Cα trace of the atomic coordinates, and shaded with colored pencil or pastels; they preserved positions, smoothed the backbone path, and incorporated small local shifts to disambiguate the visual appearance. As well as the triose isomerase ribbon drawing shown in the figure, other hand-drawn examples depicted prealbumin, flavodoxin, and Cu,Zn superoxide dismutase.

In 1982, Arthur M. Lesk and co-workers first enabled the automatic generation of ribbon diagrams through a computational implementation that uses Protein Data Bank files as input. This conceptually simple algorithm fitted cubic polynomial B-spline curves to the peptide planes. Most modern graphics systems provide either B-splines or Hermite splines as a basic drawing primitive. One type of spline implementation passes through each Cα guide point, producing an exact but choppy curve. Both hand-drawn and most computer ribbons (such as those shown here) are smoothed over about four successive guide points (usually the peptide midpoint) to produce a more visually pleasing and understandable representation. To give the right radius for helical spirals while preserving smooth β-strands, the splines can be modified by offsets proportional to local curvature, as first developed by Mike Carson for his Ribbons program and later adopted by other molecular graphics software, such as the open-source Mage program for kinemage graphics that produced the ribbon image at top right (other examples: 1XK8 trimer and DNA polymerase).

Since their inception, and continuing in the present, ribbon diagrams have been the single most common representation of protein structure and a common choice of cover image for a journal or textbook.

=== Current computer programs ===
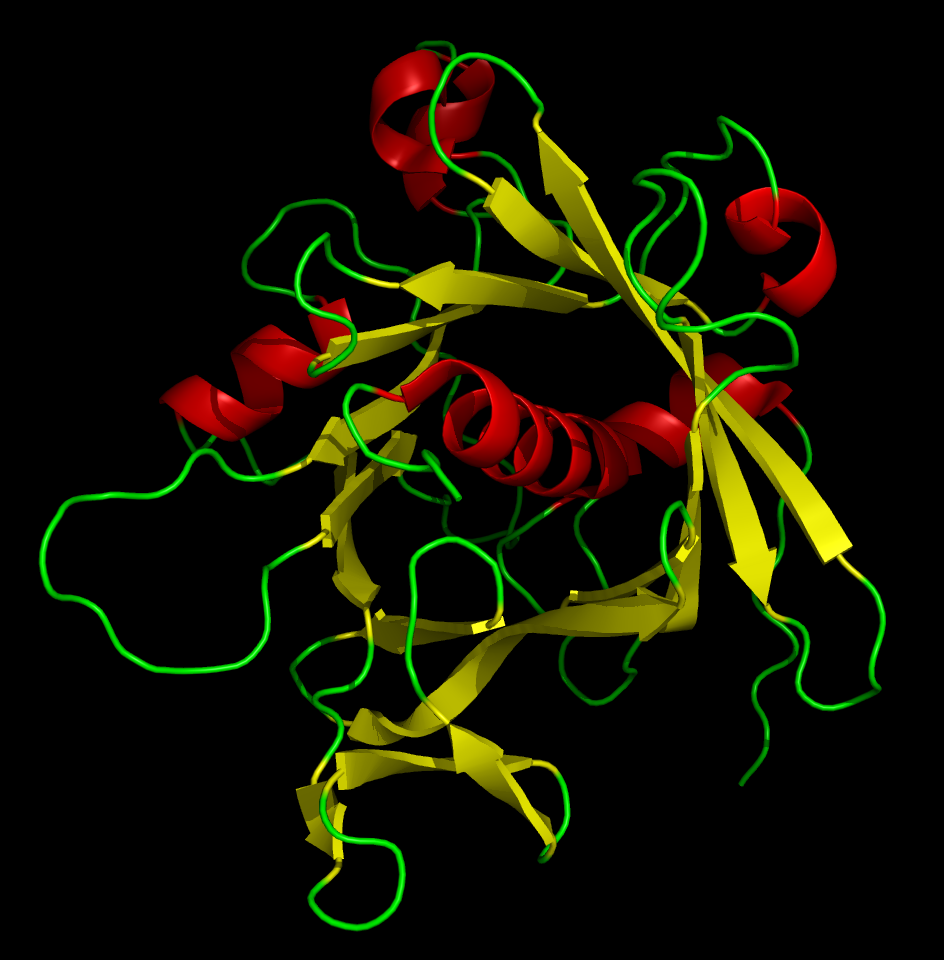
PyMol ribbon of the structure of the tubby protein (PDB: 1C8Z)

One popular program used for drawing ribbon diagrams is Molscript. Molscript utilizes Hermite splines to create coordinates for coils, turns, strands, and helices. The curve passes through all its control points (Cα atoms) guided by direction vectors. The program was built based on traditional molecular graphics by Arthur M. Lesk, Karl Hardman, and John Priestle. Jmol is an open-source Java-based viewer for browsing molecular structures on the web; it includes a simplified "cartoon" version of ribbons. Other graphics programs such as DeepView (example: urease) and MolMol (example: SH2 domain) also produce ribbon images. KiNG is the Java-based successor to Mage (examples: α-hemolysin top view and side view).

UCSF Chimera is a powerful molecular modeling program that also includes visualizations such as ribbons, notable especially for the ability to combine them with contoured shapes from cryo-electron microscopy data. PyMOL, by Warren DeLano, is a popular and flexible molecular graphics program (based on Python) that operates in interactive mode and also produces presentation-quality 2D images for ribbon diagrams and many other representations.

== Features ==
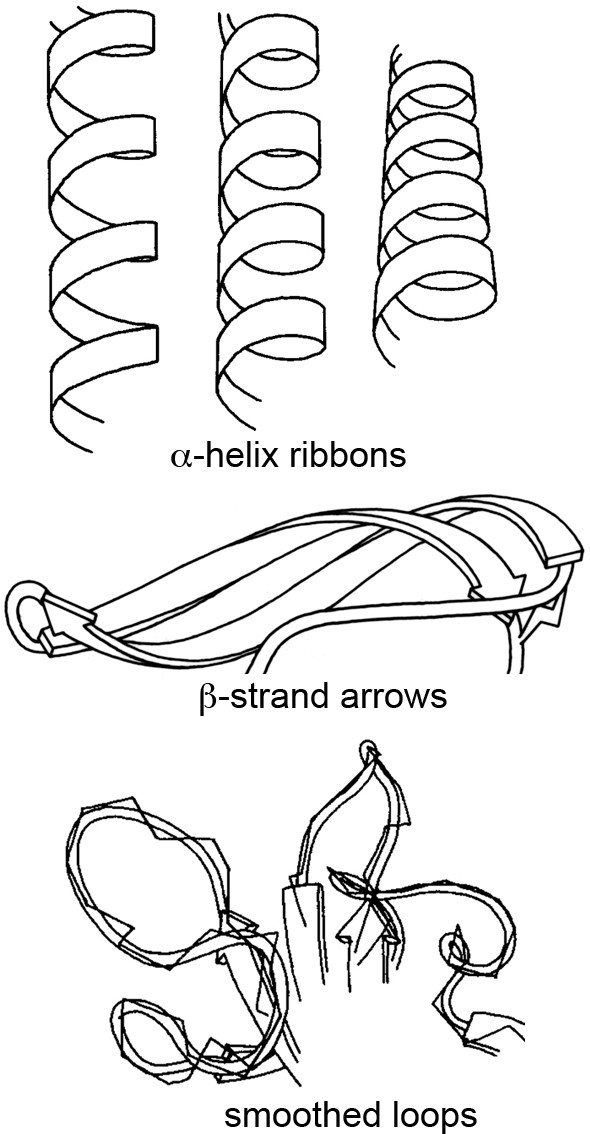

Secondary structure	
α-Helices	Cylindrical spiral ribbons, with ribbon plane approximately following plane of peptides.
β-Strands	Arrows with thickness, about one-quarter as thick as they are wide, showing direction and twist of the strand from amino to carboxy end. β-sheets are seen as unified because neighboring strands twist in unison.
Loops and miscellaneous	
Nonrepetitive loops	Round ropes that are fatter in the foreground and thinner towards the back, following smoothed path of Cα trace.
Junctions between loops and helices	Round rope that gradually flattens out into a thin helical ribbon.
Other features	
Polypeptide direction, NH_{2} and COOH termini	Small arrows on one or both of the termini, or letters. For β-strands, the direction of the arrow is sufficient. Today, the direction of the polypeptide chain is often indicated by a colour ramp.
Disulfide bonds	Interlocked SS symbol or a zigzag, like a stylized lightning stroke.
Prosthetic group or inhibitors	Stick figures, or ball & stick.
Metals	Spheres.
Shading and colour	Shading or colour adds dimensionality to the diagram. Generally, the features at the front are the highest in contrast and those towards the back are the lowest.

== See also ==
- Molecular graphics
