= Mark B. Gerstein =

American bioinformatician

Mark Gerstein
- Born: Mark Bender Gerstein; February 23
- Citizenship: US
- Education: Harvard University (AB); University of Cambridge (PhD)
- Awards: AAAS Fellow; W. M. Keck Foundation Distinguished Young Scholar; Herchel Smith Scholarship; ISCB Fellow and Senior Scientist Award
- Scientific career
- Fields: Bioinformatics
- Workplaces: Harvard University; University of Cambridge; MRC Laboratory of Molecular Biology; Stanford University; Yale University
- Thesis: Protein recognition: surfaces and conformational change (1993)
- Doctoral advisor: Cyrus Chothia; Ruth Lynden-Bell
- Other academic advisors: Michael Levitt (postdoc)
- Doctoral students: Werner Krebs
- Other notable students: Jan O. Korbel
- Website: www.gersteinlab.org

Mark Bender Gerstein is an American scientist working in bioinformatics and data science. He is the Albert L. Williams Professor of Biomedical Informatics, professor of molecular biophysics & biochemistry, professor of statistics & data science, and professor of computer science at Yale University. He is also co-director of the Yale Computational Biology and Bioinformatics program. In 2018, Gerstein was named co-director of the Yale Center for Biomedical Data Science.

== Education ==
After graduating from Harvard College summa cum laude with a Bachelor of Arts in physics in 1989, Gerstein did a PhD co-supervised by Ruth Lynden-Bell at the University of Cambridge and Cyrus Chothia at the Laboratory of Molecular Biology on liquid simulation and macromolecular conformational change in proteins, graduating in 1993. He then went on to postdoctoral research in bioinformatics at Stanford University from 1993 to 1996 supervised by Nobel-laureate Michael Levitt.

== Research ==
Gerstein does research in the field of bioinformatics. This involves applying a range of computational approaches to problems in molecular biology, including data mining and machine learning, molecular simulation, and database design. His research group has a number of foci including annotating the human genome, personal genomics, cancer genomics, building AL/ML tools, analyzing molecular networks, simulating macromolecular motions, and processing biosensor and imaging data. Notable databases and tools that the group has developed include the Database of Macromolecular Motions, which categorizes macromolecular conformational change; tYNA, which helps analyze molecular networks; PubNet, which analyzes publication networks; PeakSeq, which identifies regions in the genome bound by particular transcription factors; and CNVnator, which categorizes block variants in the genome. Gerstein has also written extensively on how general issues in data science impact on genomics—in particular, in relation to privacy and to structuring scientific communication.

Gerstein's work has been published in peer reviewed scientific journals and non-scientific publications in more popular forums. His work has been highly cited, with an H greater than 200. He serves on a number of editorial and advisory boards, including those of PLoS Computational Biology, Genome Research, Genome Biology, and Molecular Systems Biology. He has been quoted in the New York Times, including on the front page, and in other major newspapers.

== Awards and honors ==
In addition to a W. M. Keck Foundation Distinguished Young Scholars award, Gerstein has received awards from the US Navy, IBM, Pharmaceutical Research and Manufacturers of America, and the Donaghue Foundation. He is a Fellow of the AAAS. Other awards include a Herchel-Smith Scholarship supporting his doctoral work at Emmanuel College, Cambridge and a Damon Runyon Cancer Research Foundation Postdoctoral Fellowship. He is a contributor to a number of scientific consortia including ENCODE, modENCODE, 1000 Genomes Project, Brainspan, and DOE Kbase. He was made a Fellow of the International Society for Computational Biology (ISCB) in 2015 and also received an Accomplishments by a Senior Scientist Award from the ISCB in 2023.
