= Protein domain =

Self-stable region of a protein's chain that folds independently from the rest

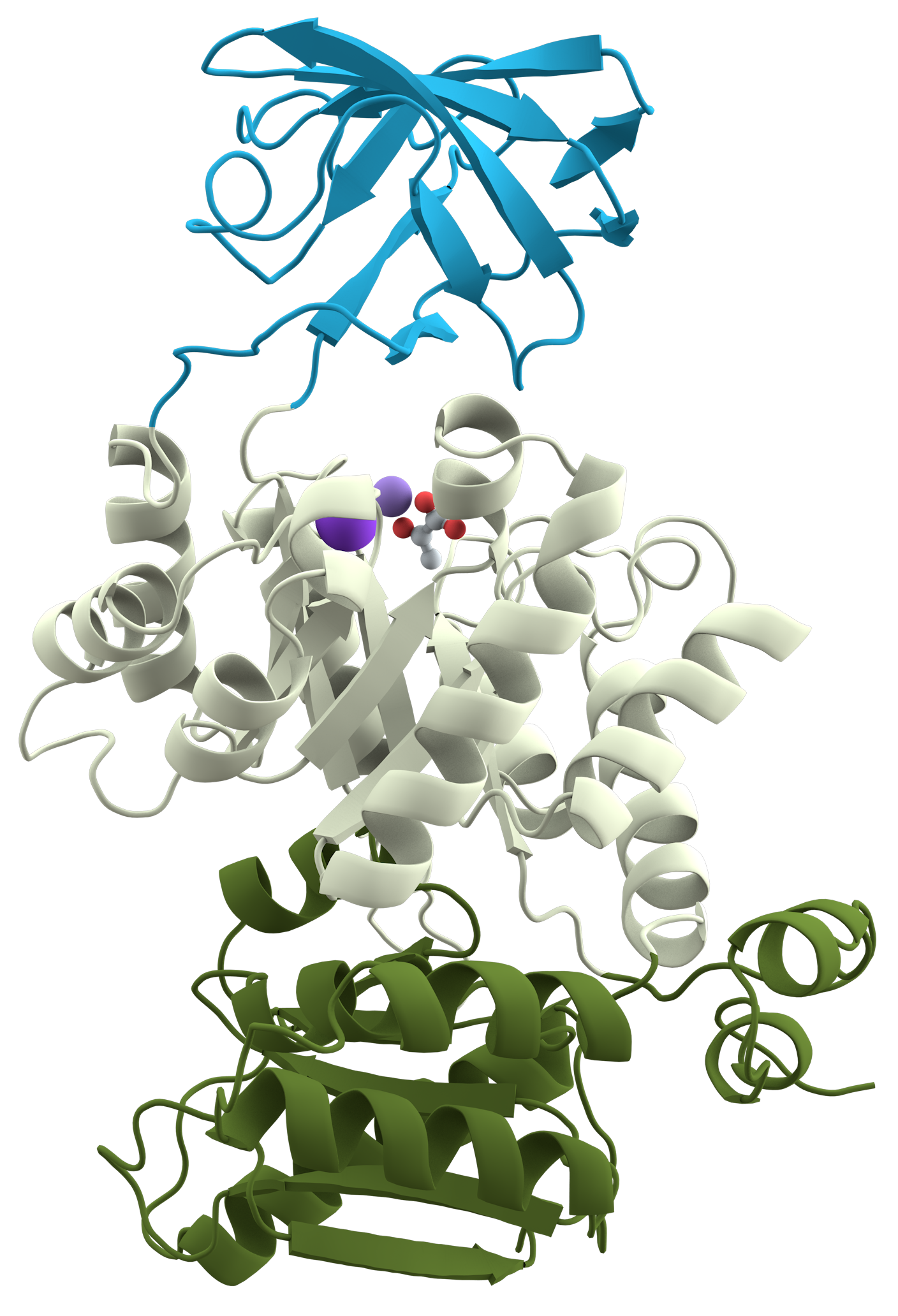
Pyruvate kinase, a protein with three domains (PDB: 1PKN).

In molecular biology, a protein domain is a region of a protein's polypeptide chain that is self-stabilizing and folds independently from the rest. Each domain forms a compact, folded three-dimensional structure. Many proteins consist of several domains, and a domain may appear in a variety of different proteins. Molecular evolution uses domains as building blocks and these may be recombined in different arrangements to create proteins with different functions. Domains vary in length from about 50 to 250 amino acids.

The shortest domains, such as zinc fingers, are stabilized by metal ions or disulfide bridges. Domains often form functional units, such as the calcium-binding EF hand domain of calmodulin. Because they are independently stable, domains can be "swapped" by genetic engineering between one protein and another to make chimeric proteins.

== Background ==
The concept of the domain was first proposed in 1973 by Wetlaufer after X-ray crystallographic studies of hen lysozyme and papain and by limited proteolysis studies of immunoglobulins. Wetlaufer defined domains as stable units of protein structure that could fold autonomously. In the past domains have been described as units of:

- compact structure
- function and evolution
- folding.

Each definition is valid and will often overlap, i.e. a compact structural domain that is found amongst diverse proteins is likely to fold independently within its structural environment. Nature often brings several domains together to form multidomain and multifunctional proteins with a vast number of possibilities. In a multidomain protein, each domain may fulfill its own function independently, or in a concerted manner with its neighbours. Domains can either serve as modules for building up large assemblies such as virus particles or muscle fibres, or can provide specific catalytic or binding sites as found in enzymes or regulatory proteins.

== Example: Pyruvate kinase ==
An appropriate example is pyruvate kinase (see first figure), a glycolytic enzyme that plays an important role in regulating the flux from fructose-1,6-biphosphate to pyruvate. It contains an all-β nucleotide-binding domain (in blue), an α/β-substrate binding domain (in grey) and an α/β-regulatory domain (in olive green), connected by several polypeptide linkers. Each domain in this protein occurs in diverse sets of protein families.

The central α/β-barrel substrate binding domain is one of the most common enzyme folds. It is seen in many different enzyme families catalysing completely unrelated reactions. The α/β-barrel is commonly called the TIM barrel named after triose phosphate isomerase, which was the first such structure to be solved. It is currently classified into 26 homologous families in the CATH domain database. The TIM barrel is formed from a sequence of β-α-β motifs closed by the first and last strand hydrogen bonding together, forming an eight stranded barrel. There is debate about the evolutionary origin of this domain. One study has suggested that a single ancestral enzyme could have diverged into several families, while another suggests that a stable TIM-barrel structure has evolved through convergent evolution.

The TIM-barrel in pyruvate kinase is 'discontinuous', meaning that more than one segment of the polypeptide is required to form the domain. This is likely to be the result of the insertion of one domain into another during the protein's evolution. It has been shown from known structures that about a quarter of structural domains are discontinuous. The inserted β-barrel regulatory domain is 'continuous', made up of a single stretch of polypeptide.

== Units of protein structure ==
In general, protein domains vary in length from about 50 to 250 amino acids.

The primary structure (string of amino acids) of a protein ultimately encodes its uniquely folded three-dimensional (3D) conformation. The most important factor governing the folding of a protein into 3D structure is the distribution of polar and non-polar side chains. Folding is driven by the burial of hydrophobic side chains into the interior of the molecule so to avoid contact with the aqueous environment. Generally proteins have a core of hydrophobic residues surrounded by a shell of hydrophilic residues. Since the peptide bonds themselves are polar they are neutralised by hydrogen bonding with each other when in the hydrophobic environment. This gives rise to regions of the polypeptide that form regular 3D structural patterns called secondary structure. There are two main types of secondary structure: α-helices and β-sheets.

Some simple combinations of secondary structure elements have been found to frequently occur in protein structure and are referred to as supersecondary structure or motifs. For example, the β-hairpin motif consists of two adjacent antiparallel β-strands joined by a small loop. It is present in most antiparallel β structures both as an isolated ribbon and as part of more complex β-sheets. Another common super-secondary structure is the β-α-β motif, which is frequently used to connect two parallel β-strands. The central α-helix connects the C-termini of the first strand to the N-termini of the second strand, packing its side chains against the β-sheet and therefore shielding the hydrophobic residues of the β-strands from the surface.

Covalent association of two domains represents a functional and structural advantage since there is an increase in stability when compared with the same structures non-covalently associated. Other advantages are the protection of intermediates within inter-domain enzymatic clefts that may otherwise be unstable in aqueous environments, and a fixed stoichiometric ratio of the enzymatic activity necessary for a sequential set of reactions.

Structural alignment is an important tool for determining domains.

=== Tertiary structure ===
Several motifs pack together to form compact, local, semi-independent units called domains. The overall 3D structure of the polypeptide chain is referred to as the protein's tertiary structure. Domains are the fundamental units of tertiary structure, each domain containing an individual hydrophobic core built from secondary structural units connected by loop regions. The packing of the polypeptide is usually much tighter in the interior than the exterior of the domain producing a solid-like core and a fluid-like surface. Core residues are often conserved in a protein family, whereas the residues in loops are less conserved, unless they are involved in the protein's function. Protein tertiary structure can be divided into four main classes based on the secondary structural content of the domain.

- All-α domains have a domain core built exclusively from α-helices. This class is dominated by small folds, many of which form a simple bundle with helices running up and down.
- All-β domains have a core composed of antiparallel β-sheets, usually two sheets packed against each other. Various patterns can be identified in the arrangement of the strands, often giving rise to the identification of recurring motifs, for example the Greek key motif.
- α+β domains are a mixture of all-α and all-β motifs. Classification of proteins into this class is difficult because of overlaps to the other three classes and therefore is not used in the CATH domain database.
- α/β domains are made from a combination of β-α-β motifs that predominantly form a parallel β-sheet surrounded by amphipathic α-helices. The secondary structures are arranged in layers or barrels.

=== Limits on size ===
Domains have limits on size. The size of individual structural domains varies from 36 residues in E-selectin to 692 residues in lipoxygenase-1, but the majority, 90%, have fewer than 200 residues with an average of approximately 100 residues. Very short domains, less than 40 residues, are often stabilised by metal ions or disulfide bonds. Larger domains, greater than 300 residues, are likely to consist of multiple hydrophobic cores.

=== Quaternary structure ===
Many proteins have a quaternary structure, which consists of several polypeptide chains that associate into an oligomeric molecule. Each polypeptide chain in such a protein is called a subunit. Hemoglobin, for example, consists of two α and two β subunits. Each of the four chains has an all-α globin fold with a heme pocket.

==== Domain swapping ====
Domain swapping is a mechanism for forming oligomeric assemblies. In domain swapping, a secondary or tertiary element of a monomeric protein is replaced by the same element of another protein. Domain swapping can range from secondary structure elements to whole structural domains. It also represents a model of evolution for functional adaptation by oligomerisation, e.g. oligomeric enzymes that have their active site at subunit interfaces.

== Domains as evolutionary modules ==
Nature is a tinkerer and not an inventor, new sequences are adapted from pre-existing sequences rather than invented. Domains are the common material used by nature to generate new sequences; they can be thought of as genetically mobile units, referred to as 'modules'. Often, the C and N termini of domains are close together in space, allowing them to easily be "slotted into" parent structures during the process of evolution. Many domain families are found in all three forms of life, Archaea, Bacteria and Eukarya. Protein modules are a subset of protein domains which are found across a range of different proteins with a particularly versatile structure. Examples can be found among extracellular proteins associated with clotting, fibrinolysis, complement, the extracellular matrix, cell surface adhesion molecules and cytokine receptors. Four concrete examples of widespread protein modules are the following domains: SH2, immunoglobulin, fibronectin type 3 and the kringle.

Molecular evolution gives rise to families of related proteins with similar sequence and structure. However, sequence similarities can be extremely low between proteins that share the same structure. Protein structures may be similar because proteins have diverged from a common ancestor. Alternatively, some folds may be more favored than others as they represent stable arrangements of secondary structures and some proteins may converge towards these folds over the course of evolution. There are currently more than 200,000 experimentally determined protein 3D structures deposited within the Protein Data Bank. However, this set contains many identical or very similar structures. All proteins should be classified to structural families to understand their evolutionary relationships. Structural comparisons are best achieved at the domain level. For this reason many algorithms have been developed to automatically assign domains in proteins with known 3D structure (see § Domain definition from structural co-ordinates).

The CATH domain database classifies domains into approximately 800 fold families; ten of these folds are highly populated and are referred to as 'super-folds'. Super-folds are defined as folds for which there are at least three structures without significant sequence similarity. The most populated is the α/β-barrel super-fold, as described previously.

== Multidomain proteins ==
The majority of proteins, two-thirds in unicellular organisms and more than 80% in metazoa, are multidomain proteins. However, other studies concluded that 40% of prokaryotic proteins consist of multiple domains while eukaryotes have approximately 65% multi-domain proteins.

Many domains in eukaryotic multidomain proteins can be found as independent proteins in prokaryotes, suggesting that domains in multidomain proteins have once existed as independent proteins. For example, vertebrates have a multi-enzyme polypeptide containing the GAR synthetase, AIR synthetase and GAR transformylase domains (GARs-AIRs-GARt; GAR: glycinamide ribonucleotide synthetase/transferase; AIR: aminoimidazole ribonucleotide synthetase). In insects, the polypeptide appears as GARs-(AIRs)2-GARt, in yeast GARs-AIRs is encoded separately from GARt, and in bacteria each domain is encoded separately.

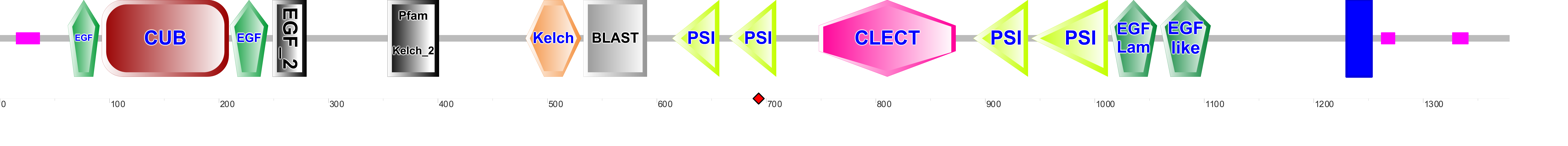
(scrollable image) Attractin-like protein 1 (ATRNL1) is a multi-domain protein found in animals, including humans. Each unit is one domain, e.g. the EGF or Kelch domains.

=== Origin ===
Multidomain proteins are likely to have emerged from selective pressure during evolution to create new functions. Various proteins have diverged from common ancestors by different combinations and associations of domains. Modular units frequently move about, within and between biological systems through mechanisms of genetic shuffling:

- transposition of mobile elements including horizontal transfers (between species);
- gross rearrangements such as inversions, translocations, deletions and duplications;
- homologous recombination;
- slippage of DNA polymerase during replication.

=== Types of organization ===
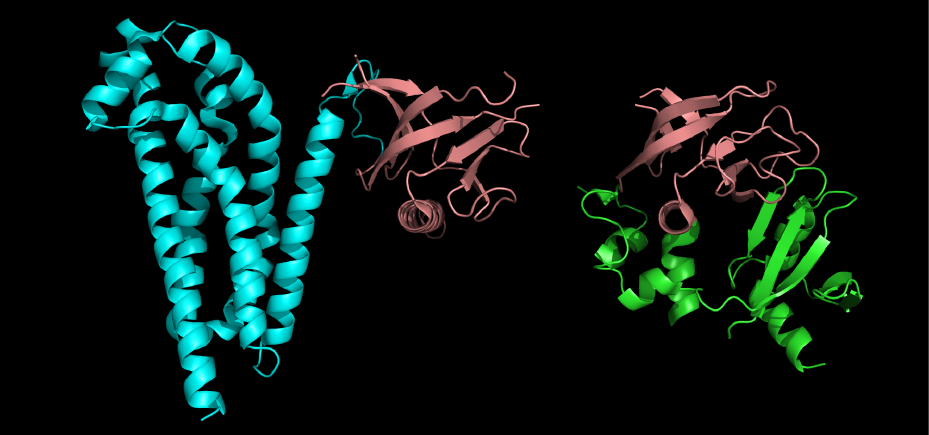
Insertions of similar PH domain modules (maroon) into two different proteins.

The simplest multidomain organization seen in proteins is that of a single domain repeated in tandem. The domains may interact with each other (domain-domain interaction) or remain isolated, like beads on string. The giant 30,000 residue muscle protein titin comprises about 120 fibronectin-III-type and Ig-type domains. In the serine proteases, a gene duplication event has led to the formation of a two β-barrel domain enzyme. The repeats have diverged so widely that there is no obvious sequence similarity between them. The active site is located at a cleft between the two β-barrel domains, in which functionally important residues are contributed from each domain. Genetically engineered mutants of the chymotrypsin serine protease were shown to have some proteinase activity even though their active site residues were abolished and it has therefore been postulated that the duplication event enhanced the enzyme's activity.

Modules frequently display different connectivity relationships, as illustrated by the kinesins and ABC transporters. The kinesin motor domain can be at either end of a polypeptide chain that includes a coiled-coil region and a cargo domain. ABC transporters are built with up to four domains consisting of two unrelated modules, ATP-binding cassette and an integral membrane module, arranged in various combinations.

Not only do domains recombine, but there are many examples of a domain having been inserted into another. Sequence or structural similarities to other domains demonstrate that homologues of inserted and parent domains can exist independently. An example is that of the 'fingers' inserted into the 'palm' domain within the polymerases of the Pol I family. Since a domain can be inserted into another, there should always be at least one continuous domain in a multidomain protein. This is the main difference between definitions of structural domains and evolutionary/functional domains. An evolutionary domain will be limited to one or two connections between domains, whereas structural domains can have unlimited connections, within a given criterion of the existence of a common core. Several structural domains could be assigned to an evolutionary domain.

A superdomain consists of two or more conserved domains of nominally independent origin, but subsequently inherited as a single structural/functional unit. This combined superdomain can occur in diverse proteins that are not related by gene duplication alone. An example of a superdomain is the protein tyrosine phosphatase–C2 domain pair in PTEN, tensin, auxilin and the membrane protein TPTE2. This superdomain is found in proteins in animals, plants and fungi. A key feature of the PTP-C2 superdomain is amino acid residue conservation in the domain interface.

== Domains are autonomous folding units ==
=== Folding ===
Protein folding - the unsolved problem : Since the seminal work of Anfinsen in the early 1960s, the goal to completely understand the mechanism by which a polypeptide rapidly folds into its stable native conformation remains elusive. Many experimental folding studies have contributed much to our understanding, but the principles that govern protein folding are still based on those discovered in the very first studies of folding. Anfinsen showed that the native state of a protein is thermodynamically stable, the conformation being at a global minimum of its free energy.

Folding is a directed search of conformational space allowing the protein to fold on a biologically feasible time scale. The Levinthal paradox states that if an averaged sized protein would sample all possible conformations before finding the one with the lowest energy, the whole process would take billions of years. Proteins typically fold within 0.1 and 1000 seconds. Therefore, the protein folding process must be directed some way through a specific folding pathway. The forces that direct this search are likely to be a combination of local and global influences whose effects are felt at various stages of the reaction.

Advances in experimental and theoretical studies have shown that folding can be viewed in terms of energy landscapes, where folding kinetics is considered as a progressive organisation of an ensemble of partially folded structures through which a protein passes on its way to the folded structure. This has been described in terms of a folding funnel, in which an unfolded protein has a large number of conformational states available and there are fewer states available to the folded protein. A funnel implies that for protein folding there is a decrease in energy and loss of entropy with increasing tertiary structure formation. The local roughness of the funnel reflects kinetic traps, corresponding to the accumulation of misfolded intermediates. A folding chain progresses toward lower intra-chain free-energies by increasing its compactness. The chain's conformational options become increasingly narrowed ultimately toward one native structure.

=== Advantage of domains in protein folding ===
The organisation of large proteins by structural domains represents an advantage for protein folding, with each domain being able to individually fold, accelerating the folding process and reducing a potentially large combination of residue interactions. Furthermore, given the observed random distribution of hydrophobic residues in proteins, domain formation appears to be the optimal solution for a large protein to bury its hydrophobic residues while keeping the hydrophilic residues at the surface.

However, the role of inter-domain interactions in protein folding and in energetics of stabilisation of the native structure, probably differs for each protein. In T4 lysozyme, the influence of one domain on the other is so strong that the entire molecule is resistant to proteolytic cleavage. In this case, folding is a sequential process where the C-terminal domain is required to fold independently in an early step, and the other domain requires the presence of the folded C-terminal domain for folding and stabilisation.

It has been found that the folding of an isolated domain can take place at the same rate or sometimes faster than that of the integrated domain, suggesting that unfavourable interactions with the rest of the protein can occur during folding. Several arguments suggest that the slowest step in the folding of large proteins is the pairing of the folded domains. This is either because the domains are not folded entirely correctly or because the small adjustments required for their interaction are energetically unfavourable, such as the removal of water from the domain interface.

== Domains and protein flexibility ==
Protein domain dynamics play a key role in a multitude of molecular recognition and signaling processes. Protein domains, connected by intrinsically disordered flexible linker domains, induce long-range allostery via protein domain dynamics. The resultant dynamic modes cannot be generally predicted from static structures of either the entire protein or individual domains.

== Domain definition from structural co-ordinates ==
The importance of domains as structural building blocks and elements of evolution has brought about many automated methods for their identification and classification in proteins of known structure. Automatic procedures for reliable domain assignment is essential for the generation of the domain databases, especially as the number of known protein structures is increasing. Although the boundaries of a domain can be determined by visual inspection, construction of an automated method is not straightforward. Problems occur when faced with domains that are discontinuous or highly associated. The fact that there is no standard definition of what a domain really is has meant that domain assignments have varied enormously, with each researcher using a unique set of criteria.

A structural domain is a compact, globular sub-structure with more interactions within it than with the rest of the protein. Therefore, a structural domain can be determined by two visual characteristics: its compactness and its extent of isolation. Measures of local compactness in proteins have been used in many of the early methods of domain assignment and in several of the more recent methods.

=== Methods ===
One of the first algorithms used a Cα-Cα distance map together with a hierarchical clustering routine that considered proteins as several small segments, 10 residues in length. The initial segments were clustered one after another based on inter-segment distances; segments with the shortest distances were clustered and considered as single segments thereafter. The stepwise clustering finally included the full protein. Go also exploited the fact that inter-domain distances are normally larger than intra-domain distances; all possible Cα-Cα distances were represented as diagonal plots in which there were distinct patterns for helices, extended strands and combinations of secondary structures.

The method by Sowdhamini and Blundell clusters secondary structures in a protein based on their Cα-Cα distances and identifies domains from the pattern in their dendrograms. As the procedure does not consider the protein as a continuous chain of amino acids there are no problems in treating discontinuous domains. Specific nodes in these dendrograms are identified as tertiary structural clusters of the protein, these include both super-secondary structures and domains. The DOMAK algorithm is used to create the 3Dee domain database. It calculates a 'split value' from the number of each type of contact when the protein is divided arbitrarily into two parts. This split value is large when the two parts of the structure are distinct.

The method of Wodak and Janin was based on the calculated interface areas between two chain segments repeatedly cleaved at various residue positions. Interface areas were calculated by comparing surface areas of the cleaved segments with that of the native structure. Potential domain boundaries can be identified at a site where the interface area was at a minimum. Other methods have used measures of solvent accessibility to calculate compactness.

The PUU algorithm incorporates a harmonic model used to approximate inter-domain dynamics. The underlying physical concept is that many rigid interactions will occur within each domain and loose interactions will occur between domains. This algorithm is used to define domains in the FSSP domain database.

Swindells (1995) developed a method, DETECTIVE, for identification of domains in protein structures based on the idea that domains have a hydrophobic interior. Deficiencies were found to occur when hydrophobic cores from different domains continue through the interface region.

RigidFinder is a novel method for identification of protein rigid blocks (domains and loops) from two different conformations. Rigid blocks are defined as blocks where all inter residue distances are conserved across conformations.

The method RIBFIND developed by Pandurangan and Topf identifies rigid bodies in protein structures by performing spacial clustering of secondary structural elements in proteins. The RIBFIND rigid bodies have been used to flexibly fit protein structures into cryo electron microscopy density maps.

A general method to identify dynamical domains, that is protein regions that behave approximately as rigid units in the course of structural fluctuations, has been introduced by Potestio et al. and, among other applications was also used to compare the consistency of the dynamics-based domain subdivisions with standard structure-based ones. The method, termed PiSQRD, is publicly available in the form of a webserver. The latter allows users to optimally subdivide single-chain or multimeric proteins into quasi-rigid domains based on the collective modes of fluctuation of the system. By default the latter are calculated through an elastic network model; alternatively pre-calculated essential dynamical spaces can be uploaded by the user.

=== Example domains ===
- Armadillo repeats: named after the β-catenin-like Armadillo protein of the fruit fly Drosophila melanogaster.
- Basic leucine zipper domain (bZIP domain): found in many DNA-binding eukaryotic proteins. One part of the domain contains a region that mediates sequence-specific DNA-binding properties and the Leucine zipper that is required for the dimerization of two DNA-binding regions. The DNA-binding region comprises a number of basic aminoacids such as arginine and lysine.
- Cadherin repeats: Cadherins function as Ca^{2+}-dependent cell–cell adhesion proteins. Cadherin domains are extracellular regions which mediate cell-to-cell homophilic binding between cadherins on the surface of adjacent cells.
- Death effector domain (DED): allows protein–protein binding by homotypic interactions (DED-DED). Caspase proteases trigger apoptosis via proteolytic cascades. Pro-caspase-8 and pro-caspase-9 bind to specific adaptor molecules via DED domains, which leads to autoactivation of caspases.
- EF hand: a helix-turn-helix structural motif found in each structural domain of the signaling protein calmodulin and in the muscle protein troponin-C.
- Foldon domain: A small protein domain from fibritin in T4 bacteriophage that can cause proteins to trimerize.
- Immunoglobulin-like domains: found in proteins of the immunoglobulin superfamily (IgSF). They contain about 70-110 amino acids and are classified into different categories (IgV, IgC1, IgC2 and IgI) according to their size and function. They possess a characteristic fold in which two beta sheets form a "sandwich" that is stabilized by interactions between conserved cysteines and other charged amino acids. They are important for protein–protein interactions in processes of cell adhesion, cell activation, and molecular recognition. These domains are commonly found in molecules with roles in the immune system.
- Phosphotyrosine-binding domain (PTB): PTB domains usually bind to phosphorylated tyrosine residues. They are often found in signal transduction proteins. PTB-domain binding specificity is determined by residues to the amino-terminal side of the phosphotyrosine. Examples: the PTB domains of both SHC and IRS-1 bind to a NPXpY sequence. PTB-containing proteins such as SHC and IRS-1 are important for insulin responses of human cells.
- Pleckstrin homology domain (PH): PH domains bind phosphoinositides with high affinity. Specificity for PtdIns(3)P, PtdIns(4)P, PtdIns(3,4)P2, PtdIns(4,5)P2, and PtdIns(3,4,5)P3 have all been observed. Given the fact that phosphoinositides are sequestered to various cell membranes (due to their long lipophilic tail) the PH domains usually causes recruitment of the protein in question to a membrane where the protein can exert a certain function in cell signalling, cytoskeletal reorganization or membrane trafficking.
- Src homology 2 domain (SH2): SH2 domains are often found in signal transduction proteins. SH2 domains confer binding to phosphorylated tyrosine (pTyr). Named after the phosphotyrosine binding domain of the src viral oncogene, which is itself a tyrosine kinase. See also: SH3 domain.
- Zinc finger DNA-binding domain (ZnF_GATA): ZnF_GATA domain-containing proteins are typically transcription factors that usually bind to the DNA sequence [AT]GATA[AG] of promoters.

== Domains of unknown function ==
A large fraction of domains are of unknown function. A domain of unknown function (DUF) is a protein domain that has no characterized function. These families have been collected together in the Pfam database using the prefix DUF followed by a number, with examples being DUF2992 and DUF1220. There are now over 3,000 DUF families within the Pfam database representing over 20% of known families. Surprisingly, the number of DUFs in Pfam has increased from 20% (in 2010) to 22% (in 2019), mostly due to an increasing number of new genome sequences. Pfam release 32.0 (2019) contained 3,961 DUFs.

== See also ==
- Binding domain
- Cofactor transferase family
- PANDIT, a biological database covering protein domains
- Pfam: database of protein domains
- Protein structure prediction
- Protein subfamily
- Protein superfamily
- Protein tandem repeats
- Short linear motif
- Structural biology
- Structural Classification of Proteins (SCOP)
- CATH Protein Structure Classification database
- Sequence motif
- Structural motif

== Key papers ==
- Berman HM, Westbrook J, Feng Z, Gilliland G, Bhat TN, Weissig H, et al. (January 2000). "The Protein Data Bank". Nucleic Acids Research. 28 (1): 235–42. doi:10.1093/nar/28.1.235. PMC 102472. PMID 10592235.
- Tooze J, Brändén CI (1999). Introduction to protein structure. New York: Garland Pub. ISBN 978-0-8153-2305-1.
- Das S, Smith TF (2000). "Identifying nature's protein Lego set". Advances in Protein Chemistry. 54: 159–83. doi:10.1016/S0065-3233(00)54006-6. ISBN 978-0-12-034254-9. PMID 10829228.
- Dietmann S, Park J, Notredame C, Heger A, Lappe M, Holm L (January 2001). "A fully automatic evolutionary classification of protein folds: Dali Domain Dictionary version 3". Nucleic Acids Research. 29 (1): 55–7. doi:10.1093/nar/29.1.55. PMC 29815. PMID 11125048.
- Dyson HJ, Sayre JR, Merutka G, Shin HC, Lerner RA, Wright PE (August 1992). "Folding of peptide fragments comprising the complete sequence of proteins. Models for initiation of protein folding. II. Plastocyanin". Journal of Molecular Biology. 226 (3): 819–35. doi:10.1016/0022-2836(92)90634-V. PMID 1507228.
- Fersht AR (February 1997). "Nucleation mechanisms in protein folding". Current Opinion in Structural Biology. 7 (1): 3–9. doi:10.1016/S0959-440X(97)80002-4. PMID 9032066.
- George DG, Hunt LT, Barker WC (1996). "[3] PIR-International protein sequence database". PIR-International Protein Sequence Database. Methods in Enzymology. Vol. 266. pp. 41–59. doi:10.1016/S0076-6879(96)66005-4. ISBN 978-0-12-182167-8. PMC 145575. PMID 8743676.
- Go M (May 1981). "Correlation of DNA exonic regions with protein structural units in haemoglobin". Nature. 291 (5810): 90–2. Bibcode:1981Natur.291...90G. doi:10.1038/291090a0. PMID 7231530. S2CID 4313732.
- Hadley C, Jones DT (September 1999). "A systematic comparison of protein structure classifications: SCOP, CATH and FSSP". Structure. 7 (9): 1099–112. doi:10.1016/S0969-2126(99)80177-4. PMID 10508779.
- Hayward S (September 1999). "Structural principles governing domain motions in proteins". Proteins. 36 (4): 425–35. doi:10.1002/(SICI)1097-0134(19990901)36:4<425::AID-PROT6>3.0.CO;2-S. PMID 10450084. S2CID 29808315.
- Heringa J, Argos P (July 1991). "Side-chain clusters in protein structures and their role in protein folding". Journal of Molecular Biology. 220 (1): 151–71. doi:10.1016/0022-2836(91)90388-M. PMID 2067014.
- Honig B (October 1999). "Protein folding: from the levinthal paradox to structure prediction". Journal of Molecular Biology. 293 (2): 283–93. doi:10.1006/jmbi.1999.3006. PMID 10550209.
- Kim PS, Baldwin RL (1990). "Intermediates in the folding reactions of small proteins". Annual Review of Biochemistry. 59 (1): 631–60. doi:10.1146/annurev.bi.59.070190.003215. PMID 2197986.
- Murvai J, Vlahovicek K, Barta E, Cataletto B, Pongor S (January 2000). "The SBASE protein domain library, release 7.0: a collection of annotated protein sequence segments". Nucleic Acids Research. 28 (1): 260–2. doi:10.1093/nar/28.1.260. PMC 102474. PMID 10592241.
- Murzin AG, Brenner SE, Hubbard T, Chothia C (April 1995). "SCOP: a structural classification of proteins database for the investigation of sequences and structures" (PDF). Journal of Molecular Biology. 247 (4): 536–40. doi:10.1016/S0022-2836(05)80134-2. PMID 7723011. Archived from the original (PDF) on 26 April 2012.
- Janin J, Chothia C (1985). "Domains in proteins: definitions, location, and structural principles". Diffraction Methods for Biological Macromolecules Part B. Methods in Enzymology. Vol. 115. pp. 420–30. doi:10.1016/0076-6879(85)15030-5. ISBN 978-0-12-182015-2. PMID 4079796.
- Schultz J, Copley RR, Doerks T, Ponting CP, Bork P (January 2000). "SMART: a web-based tool for the study of genetically mobile domains". Nucleic Acids Research. 28 (1): 231–4. doi:10.1093/nar/28.1.231. PMC 102444. PMID 10592234.
- Siddiqui AS, Dengler U, Barton GJ (February 2001). "3Dee: a database of protein structural domains". Bioinformatics. 17 (2): 200–1. doi:10.1093/bioinformatics/17.2.200. PMID 11238081.
- Srinivasarao GY, Yeh LS, Marzec CR, Orcutt BC, Barker WC, Pfeiffer F (January 1999). "Database of protein sequence alignments: PIR-ALN". Nucleic Acids Research. 27 (1): 284–5. doi:10.1093/nar/27.1.284. PMC 148157. PMID 9847202.
- Tatusov RL, Natale DA, Garkavtsev IV, Tatusova TA, Shankavaram UT, Rao BS, et al. (January 2001). "The COG database: new developments in phylogenetic classification of proteins from complete genomes". Nucleic Acids Research. 29 (1): 22–8. doi:10.1093/nar/29.1.22. PMC 29819. PMID 11125040.
- Taylor WR, Orengo CA (July 1989). "Protein structure alignment". Journal of Molecular Biology. 208 (1): 1–22. Bibcode:1989JMBio.208....1T. doi:10.1016/0022-2836(89)90084-3. PMID 2769748.
- Yang AS, Honig B (September 1995). "Free energy determinants of secondary structure formation: I. alpha-Helices". Journal of Molecular Biology. 252 (3): 351–65. doi:10.1006/jmbi.1995.0502. PMID 7563056.
- Yang AS, Honig B (September 1995). "Free energy determinants of secondary structure formation: II. Antiparallel beta-sheets". Journal of Molecular Biology. 252 (3): 366–76. doi:10.1006/jmbi.1995.0503. PMID 7563057.
- Gough J, Chothia C (January 2002). "SUPERFAMILY: HMMs representing all proteins of known structure. SCOP sequence searches, alignments and genome assignments". Nucleic Acids Research. 30 (1): 268–72. doi:10.1093/nar/30.1.268. PMC 99153. PMID 11752312.
