= Database of Molecular Motions =

Database of Macromolecular Motions
- Original authors: Mark B. Gerstein; Werner G. Krebs
- Developer: molmovdb.org team at Yale University
- Release: 1996; 30 years ago
- Type: bioinformatics database, Software as a service
- Website: molmovdb.org

The Database of Macromolecular Motions is a bioinformatics database and software-as-a-service tool that attempts to categorize macromolecular motions, sometimes also known as conformational change. It was originally developed by Mark B. Gerstein, Werner Krebs, and Nat Echols in the Molecular Biophysics & Biochemistry Department at Yale University.

== Discussion ==
Since its introduction in the late 1990s, peer-reviewed papers on the database have received thousands of citations. The database has been mentioned in news articles in major scientific journals, book chapters, and elsewhere.

Users can search the database for a particular motion by either protein name or Protein Data Bank ID number. Typically, however, users will enter the database via the Protein Data Bank, which often provides a hyperlink to the molmovdb entry for proteins found in both databases.

The database includes a web-based tool (the Morph server) which allows non-experts to animate and visualize certain types of protein conformational change through the generation of short movies. This system uses molecular modelling techniques to interpolate the structural changes between two different protein conformers and to generate a set of intermediate structures. A hyperlink pointing to the morph results is then emailed to the user.

The Morph Server was originally primarily a research tool rather than general molecular animation tool, and thus offered only limited user control over rendering, animation parameters, color, and point of view, and the original methods sometimes required a fair amount of CPU time to completion. Since their initial introduction in 1996, the database and associated morph server have undergone development to try to address some of these shortcomings as well as add new features, such as Normal Mode Analysis. Other research grounds have subsequently developed alternative systems, such as MovieMaker from the University of Alberta.

== Commercialization ==
Bioinformatics vendor DNASTAR has incorporated morphs from the database into its commercial Protean3D product. The connection between DNASTAR and the authors of the database, if any, is not immediately clear.

== See also ==
- Database of protein conformational diversity

== Notes ==
- Gu, Jenny; Bourne, Philip E. (March 2009). Structural Bioinformatics (2nd ed.). Wiley-Blackwell. ISBN 978-0-470-18105-8.
- Frauenfelder, Hans (10 June 2010). "Chapter 26 on Protein Motions". The Physics of Proteins: An Introduction to Biological Physics and Molecular Biophysics (Biological and Medical Physics, Biomedical Engineering). Springer. ISBN 978-1441910431.
- Frauenfelder H (20 April 1989). "New looks at protein motions". Nature. 338 (6217): 623–4. Bibcode:1989Natur.338..623F. doi:10.1038/338623a0. S2CID 33628943.
- Alexandrov V, Lehnert U, Echols N, Milburn D, Engelman D, Gerstein M (March 2005). "Normal modes for predicting protein motions: A comprehensive database assessment and associated Web tool". Protein Sci. 14 (3): 633–43. doi:10.1110/ps.04882105. PMC 2279292. PMID 15722444.
- Alexandrov V, Gerstein M (January 2004). "Using 3D Hidden Markov Models that explicitly represent spatial coordinates to model and compare protein structures". BMC Bioinformatics. 5: 2. doi:10.1186/1471-2105-5-2. PMC 344530. PMID 14715091.
- Echols N, Milburn D, Gerstein M (January 2003). "MolMovDB: analysis and visualization of conformational change and structural flexibility". Nucleic Acids Res. 31 (1): 478–82. doi:10.1093/nar/gkg104. PMC 165551. PMID 12520056.
- Krebs WG, Alexandrov V, Wilson CA, Echols N, Yu H, Gerstein M (September 2002). "Normal mode analysis of macromolecular motions in a database framework: developing mode concentration as a useful classifying statistic". Proteins. 48 (4): 682–95. doi:10.1002/prot.10168. PMID 12211036. S2CID 1132091.
