= Osteoderm =

Bony structures in the dermis

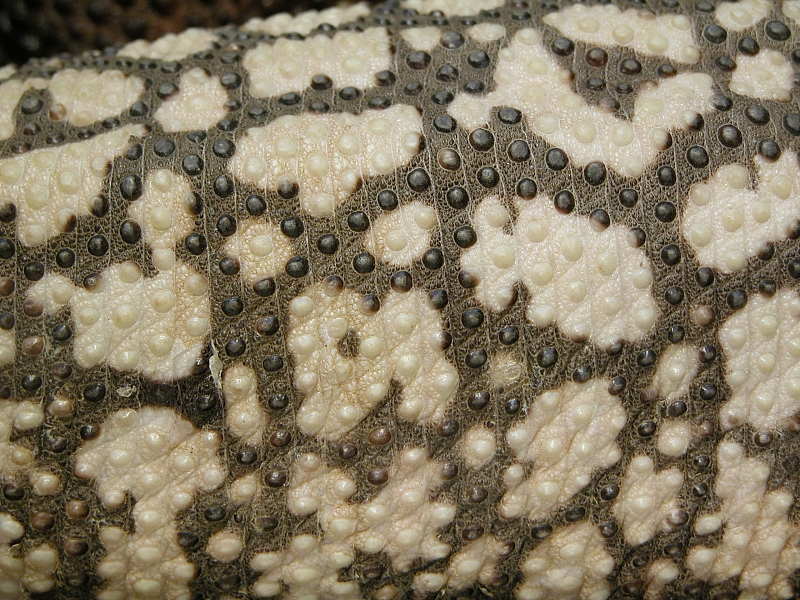
Closeup of a helodermatid's skin, revealing the osteoderms

Armadillo skeleton, with shell made of osteoderms (displayed at the Museum of Osteology)

Osteoderms are bony deposits forming scales, plates, or other structures based in the dermis. Osteoderms are found in many groups of extant and extinct reptiles and amphibians, including lizards, crocodilians, frogs, temnospondyls (extinct amphibians), various groups of dinosaurs (most notably ankylosaurs and stegosaurians), phytosaurs, aetosaurs, placodonts, and hupehsuchians (marine reptiles with possible ichthyosaur affinities).

Osteoderms are uncommon in mammals, although they have occurred in many xenarthrans (armadillos and the extinct glyptodonts and mylodontid ground sloths). The heavy, bony osteoderms have evolved independently in many different lineages. The armadillo osteoderm is believed to develop in subcutaneous dermal tissues. These varied structures should be thought of as anatomical analogues, not homologues, and do not necessarily indicate monophyly. The structures are, however, derived from scutes, which are common to all classes of amniotes, and are an example of what has been termed deep homology. In many cases, osteoderms may function as defensive armor. Osteoderms are composed of bone tissue, and are derived from a scleroblast neural crest cell population during embryonic development of the organism. The scleroblastic neural crest cell population shares some homologous characteristics associated with the dermis. Neural crest cells, through epithelial-to-mesenchymal transition, are thought to contribute to osteoderm development.

The osteoderms of modern crocodilians are heavily vascularized, and can function as both armor and as heat-exchangers, allowing them to rapidly raise or lower their temperature. Another function is to neutralize acidosis, caused by being submerged under water for longer periods of time and leading to the accumulation of carbon dioxide in the blood. The calcium and magnesium in the dermal bone will release alkaline ions into the bloodstream, acting as a buffer against acidification of the body fluids.

== See also ==
- Exoskeleton
