= Superfamily database =

SUPERFAMILY
Content
- Description: The SUPERFAMILY database provides structural and functional annotation for all proteins and genomes.
- Data types captured: Protein families, genome annotation, alignments, Hidden Markov models (HMMs)
- Organisms: all

Contact
- Research center: University of Bristol
- Laboratory: Julian Gough; Cyrus Chothia
- Primary citation: PMID 19036790

Access
- Data format: FASTA format
- Website: supfam.org
- Download URL: supfam.org/SUPERFAMILY/downloads.html

Miscellaneous
- License: GNU General Public License
- Version: 1.75

SUPERFAMILY is a database and search platform of structural and functional annotation for all proteins and genomes. It classifies amino acid sequences into known structural domains, especially into SCOP superfamilies. Domains are functional, structural, and evolutionary units that form proteins. Domains of common Ancestry are grouped into superfamilies. The domains and domain superfamilies are defined and described in SCOP. Superfamilies are groups of proteins which have structural evidence to support a common evolutionary ancestor but may not have detectable sequence homology.

== Annotations ==
The SUPERFAMILY annotation is based on a collection of hidden Markov models (HMM), which represent structural protein domains at the SCOP superfamily level. A superfamily groups together domains which have an evolutionary relationship. The annotation is produced by scanning protein sequences from completely sequenced genomes against the hidden Markov models.

For each protein you can:

- Submit sequences for SCOP classification
- View domain organisation, sequence alignments and protein sequence details

For each genome you can:

- Examine superfamily assignments, phylogenetic trees, domain organisation lists and networks
- Check for over- and under-represented superfamilies within a genome

For each superfamily you can:

- Inspect SCOP classification, functional annotation, Gene Ontology annotation, InterPro abstract and genome assignments
- Explore taxonomic distribution of a superfamily across the tree of life

All annotation, models and the database dump are freely available for download to everyone.

== Features ==
Sequence Search

Submit a protein or DNA sequence for SCOP superfamily and family level classification using the SUPERFAMILY HMM's. Sequences can be submitted either by raw input or by uploading a file, but all must be in FASTA format. Sequences can be amino acids, a fixed frame nucleotide sequence, or all frames of a submitted nucleotide sequence. Up to 1000 sequences can be run at a time.

Keyword Search

Search the database using a superfamily, family, or species name plus a sequence, SCOP, PDB, or HMM ID's. A successful search yields the class, folds, superfamilies, families, and individual proteins matching the query.

Domain Assignments

The database has domain assignments, alignments, and architectures for completely sequence eukaryotic and prokaryotic organisms, plus sequence collections.

Comparative Genomics Tools

Browse unusual (over- and under-represented) superfamilies and families, adjacent domain pair lists and graphs, unique domain pairs, domain combinations, domain architecture co-occurrence networks, and domain distribution across taxonomic kingdoms for each organism.

Genome Statistics

For each genome: number of sequences, number of sequences with assignment, percentage of sequences with assignment, percentage total sequence coverage, number of domains assigned, number of superfamilies assigned, number of families assigned, average superfamily size, percentage produced by duplication, average sequence length, average length matched, number of domain pairs, and number of unique domain architectures.

Gene Ontology

Domain-centric Gene Ontology (GO) automatically annotated.

Due to the growing gap between sequenced proteins and known functions of proteins, it is becoming increasingly important to develop a more automated method for functionally annotating proteins, especially for proteins with known domains. SUPERFAMILY uses protein-level GO annotations taken from the Genome Ontology Annotation (GOA) project, which offers high-quality GO annotations directly associated to proteins in the UniprotKB over a wide spectrum of species. SUPERFAMILY has generated GO annotations for evolutionarily closed domains (at the SCOP family level) and distant domains (at the SCOP superfamily level).

Phenotype Ontology

Domain-centric phenotype/anatomy ontology including Disease Ontology, Human Phenotype, Mouse Phenotype, Worm Phenotype, Yeast Phenotype, Fly Phenotype, Fly Anatomy, Zebrafish Anatomy, Xenopus Anatomy, and Arabidopsis Plant.

Superfamily Annotation

InterPro abstracts for over 1,000 superfamilies, and Gene Ontology (GO) annotation for over 700 superfamilies. This feature allows for the direct annotation of key features, functions, and structures of a superfamily.

Functional Annotation

Functional annotation of SCOP 1.73 superfamilies.

The SUPERFAMILY database uses a scheme of 50 detailed function categories which map to 7 general function categories, similar to the scheme used in the COG database. A general function assigned to a superfamily was used to reflect the major function for that superfamily. The general categories of function are:

1. Information: storage, maintenance of genetic code; DNA replication and repair; general transcription and translation.
2. Regulation: Regulation of gene expression and protein activity; information processing in response to environmental input; signal transduction; general regulatory or receptor activity.
3. Metabolism: Anabolic and catabolic processes; cell maintenance and homeostasis; secondary metabolism.
4. Intra-cellular processes: cell motility and division; cell death; intra-cellular transport; secretion.
5. Extra-cellular processes: inter-, extr-cellular processes like cell adhesion; organismal process like blood clotting or the immune system.
6. General: General and multiple functions; interactions with proteins, lipids, small molecules, and ions.
7. Other/Unknown: an unknown function, viral proteins, or toxins.

Each domain superfamily in SCOP classes a to g were manually annotated using this scheme and the information used was provided by SCOP, InterPro, Pfam, Swiss Prot, and various literature sources.

Phylogenetic Trees

Create custom phylogenetic trees by selecting 3 or more available genomes on the SUPERFAMILY site. Trees are generated using heuristic parsimony methods, and are based on protein domain architecture data for all genomes in SUPERFAMILY. Genome combinations, or specific clades, can be displayed as individual trees.

Similar Domain Architectures

This feature allows the user to find the 10 domain architectures which are most similar to the domain architecture of interest.

Hidden Markov Models

Produce SCOP domain assignments for a sequence using the SUPERFAMILY hidden Markov models.

Profile Comparison

Find remote domain matches when the HMM search fails to find a significant match. Profile comparison (PRC) for aligning and scoring two profile HMM's are used.

Web Services

Distributed Annotation Server and linking to SUPERFAMILY.

Downloads

Sequences, assignments, models, MySQL database, and scripts - updated weekly.

== Use in Research ==
The SUPERFAMILY database has numerous research applications and has been used by many research groups for various studies. It can serve either as a database for proteins that the user wishes to examine with other methods, or to assign a function and structure to a novel or uncharacterized protein. One study found SUPERFAMILY to be very adept at correctly assigning an appropriate function and structure to a large number of domains of unknown function by comparing them to the databases hidden Markov models. Another study used SUPERFAMILY to generate a data set of 1,733 Fold superfamily domains (FSF) in use of a comparison of proteomes and functionomes for to identify the origin of cellular diversification.
