= Conformational change =

Induced shape change in macromolecules

In biochemistry, a conformational change is a change in the shape of a macromolecule, often induced by environmental factors. A macromolecule is usually flexible and dynamic. It can change its shape in response to changes in its environment or other factors; each possible shape is called a conformation, and a transition between them is called a conformational change. Factors that may induce such changes include temperature, pH, voltage, light in chromophores, ion concentration, phosphorylation, or the binding of a ligand.

== Laboratory analysis ==
Many biophysical techniques such as crystallography, NMR, electron paramagnetic resonance (EPR) using spin label techniques, circular dichroism (CD), hydrogen exchange, and FRET can be used to study macromolecular conformational change. Dual polarisation interferometry is a benchtop technique capable of measuring conformational changes in biomolecules in real time at very high resolution.

A specific nonlinear optical technique called second-harmonic generation (SHG) has been recently applied to the study of conformational change in proteins. In this method, a second-harmonic-active probe is placed at a site that undergoes motion in the protein by mutagenesis or non-site-specific attachment, and the protein is adsorbed or specifically immobilized to a surface. A change in protein conformation produces a change in the net orientation of the dye relative to the surface plane and therefore the intensity of the second harmonic beam. In a protein sample with a well-defined orientation, the tilt angle of the probe can be quantitatively determined, in real space and real time. Second-harmonic-active unnatural amino acids can also be used as probes.

Another method applies electro-switchable biosurfaces where proteins are placed on top of short DNA molecules which are then dragged through a buffer solution by application of alternating electrical potentials. By measuring their speed which ultimately depends on their hydrodynamic friction, conformational changes can be visualized.

== See also ==
- Database of protein conformational diversity
- Protein dynamics
- The Database of Macromolecular Motions (molmovdb)
