= Osteoderm development =

Formation of bony skin plates in vertebrates

Osteoderms are dermal bone structures that support the upper layer of skin and serve as protection against the elements in a large variety of extinct and extant organisms, especially reptiles. This structure is commonly called "dermal armor" and serves to protect the organism, while also helping with temperature regulation. Osteoderms represent hard tissue components of the integument, making them easy to identify in fossil examination. This dermal armor is found prominently in many lizards. Some early amphibians have this armor, but it is lost in modern species with the exception a ventral plate, called the gastralia.

Osteoderm demonstrates a slightly delayed development compared with the rest of the skeleton, as it does not appear until after hatching has occurred. Osteodermic bone develops via the transformation of the preexisting irregular, connective tissue. This mode of bone formation is identified as metaplasia. Osteoderms are not historically uniform but include a mix of tissues, including irregular calcified and un-calcified connective tissue. There is a pattern of development and modification through fusion, deletions, and sinking bones. This pattern is determined by the appearance of the ossification centers. Similarities in these centers and their sequences help to show trends in development between species. Between taxa, not all osteodermic tissue develop by homologous processes. It is agreed upon that all osteoderms may share a deep homology, connected by the similar properties of their dermis.

== Scales ==
It is important to understand that scales and osteoderms are not the same thing. In the skin of some reptiles, scales lay over the top of the protective osteoderm layer. The ratio of scale size to osteoderm size and their organization vary by species. The majority of species have a one to one ratio of scales to osteoderms, with little correlation between the layout. In the girdle-tailed lizards, for example, the scales and osteoderms are of the same size and shape and are organized alongside each other. On the other hand, in common geckos, the bony osteoderm plates are much smaller than the scales and appear to be independently organized. Many times, osteodermic tissues are interconnected in a matrix-like organization. For example, larger osteoderms are often just the fusion of smaller ones.

== Scutes ==
The plate-like formations found on the shells of turtle and tortoise shells are called "scutes." These scutes are large, protective epidermal cells that overlie the interlocking bones beneath the shell's carapace, or upper shell. Scutes are made of keratin, a protein which also makes up human fingernails, along with the horns and claws of some animals. There are different titles for scutes, depending on what region of the shell they occupy. The "central scutes" extend over the dorsal mid line of the carapace from head to tail, with the "costal scutes" running along each side of the central scutes. The "marginal scutes" run along the outer sides of the shell, and the "nuchal scutes" are found in the area directly behind the turtle's head. Lastly, the "supracaudal scutes" surround the area above the tail. It is theorized that these scutes are most likely modified osteoderms that evolved over time to become the protective shell that we see today. The difference between scutes and scales is that scutes actually form in the lower, vascularized dermis, with the epidermal layer creating only the top surface. Scales on the other hand, form in the upper epidermal layer of integument.

== Advantages ==
Evolution of predator and prey has played a role in encouraging the development and shaping of body armor. This armor gave prey species the ability to avoid harm more efficiently. The spine like processes found on the osteoderms suggest a defensive function. Because of their solid structure, they allowed the organisms to be able to withstand higher jaw forces when attacked. They increased in size, decreasing the applied jaw forces, but their larger structure also made them more difficult to remove from rocks and other burrows. The osteoderms protect the softer, vital organs as well. Growth marks and lines of arrested growth are typically helpful in estimating the age of vertebrates.

== Variability ==
There are reasons that osteoderms have such high variability between and within species. The first being the lack of specific predator species. As predator species change there are rapid changes in osteoderms. The numbers of plates fluctuate from many to few, depending on the absence or presence of predators. A prey species habitat location can influence osteoderm presence as well. For example, if the habitat decreases their ability to hide in their surroundings, they need to move at increased speeds which occurs at the expense of the body armor. The habitat also influences food availability. The food the species eats can affect mineral deposit and re-uptake levels and that would influence the amount of osteoderm present.

== Organisms (Extinct and Extant) ==
=== Dinosaurs ===
There is much variation between osteoderms of dinosaurs. No two identical dinosaur osteoderms have been collected. There are two possible explanations for the variations found. The first being function, and the other stems from development. When small osteoderms are found, they include compact structures, low remodeling and poor growth lines which suggests early development. Advanced and final stages of development are characterized by keeled elements with protuberances and an axis longer than 15 centimeters. Typically the plates are arranged in a longitudinal row in the midline, which shows bilateral symmetry. They also often match the dorsal curvature of the dinosaur. In order to distinguish between taxon of dinosaurs, scientists can evaluate the thickness of the osteoderm walls. They also analyze texture, some being smooth and other have patterned grooves. The internal structure of their osteoderms are variable as well. Some are compact and others are porus, with air pockets between them due to being highly vascularized. This variation in vasculature creates mixed histologies. The pattern of vascularization is not the same between all dinosaur species. Most have one or two vascular spaces near the midline, and then lead to a network of vascular spaces that branch to the dorsal side of the osteoderm. Based on the bone tissues found in fossils, it is thought that osteoderms may have developed from intramembranous ossification, a process where bone tissue replaces pre-existing tissue. This process in mainly supported by only extinct groups. More modern, extant reptile species are thought to develop osteoderms through metaplastic ossification, as discussed above. This process includes pre-existing and fully developed tissue becoming bone. This suggests that the bone development of these dinosaur species is not very well understood. The most modern species are not heavily armored but they have many smaller ossicles, or small bones, found in the dermis.

=== Crocodiles ===
Crocodiles have very vascularized osteoderms, that serve as protective features and for thermoregulation. Since crocodiles submerge completely underwater for long periods of time, the osteoderms release neutralizing ions into the bloodstream that buffer the accumulating carbon dioxide and prevent acidosis. Osteoderms of crocodiles are highly developed. They are often seen as a paired row of rectangular plates that extend down the dorsal side, as well as down the sides and on the tail. The most distal portion of the tail is unarmored and there is a break between those in the neck and trunk. There are two longitudinal rows with at least 12 horizontal rows that extend down the trunk. The external surface of the osteoderm is formed by central oval pits that are relatively deep, whereas the internal surface includes more randomly distributed grooves that are perforated by a nutrient canal. The paravertebral osteoderms are convex in comparison to the external which are vaulted. The width of osteoderms increases from cranial to caudal (head to tail), but when they reach the tenth lumbar vertebrae, the width decreases down the tail. Crocodiles have accessory osteoderms that are typically smaller, more medial, and square shaped. There are at least two accessory osteoderms on each side of the trunk. A crocodile's body armor allows for good ventral and lateral flexibility but are very limited dorsally.

=== Lizards ===
Lizards have wide spread forms of osteoderms, especially on the skull roof which fuses with the present dermal bone. These cranial osteoderms are comparable to the ones on the body. Typically lizards have 2 longitudinal rows that include large medial and smaller lateral plates. These plates extend down the neck, trunk and tail. Over time, horizontal rows develop under the body that include small lateral plates that can connect the ventral and dorsal osteoderms. This connection encloses the body with the exception of the limbs and cloaca. Osteoderms used to be very thick in the primitive lizards, but over time the ossicles have become smaller and osteoderms are not compounded in the more modern forms. The structure of lizard osteoderms is relatively simple. They have a deep layer of lamellar bone, and a more apparent layer of woven fibered bone. Over time these osteoderms become even more simplified. Some lizards have different additional elements of the osteoderm that are accessories to the normal cranial elements. These elements include supraorbitals that project back and out, others include frills and horns. Inner remodeling doesn't occur in the osteoderms of lizards, making it difficult to estimate their age and predict the development of the osteoderm.

=== Mammals ===
While ostoederm in mammals are quite rare, some species have evolved to use this dermal structure to their advantage. Among mammals, osteoderms occur only in members of the group of organisms known as Xenarthrans. This clade includes armadillos and their extinct relatives: glyptodonts, pampatheres, and ground sloths. In extant armadillo species, their osteoderms are physically linked to their nerves, muscles, glands, and connective tissues, creating a very sensitive, dynamic integument system. The carapace of an armadillo consists of a thin layer of keratin over the top of a compacted matrix of bony osteoderm tiles that are connected via collagen fibers. Armadillos are the only living mammals with an outer carapace shell that consists of ossified dermal tissue.
