= Bissan Al-Lazikani =

Data scientist

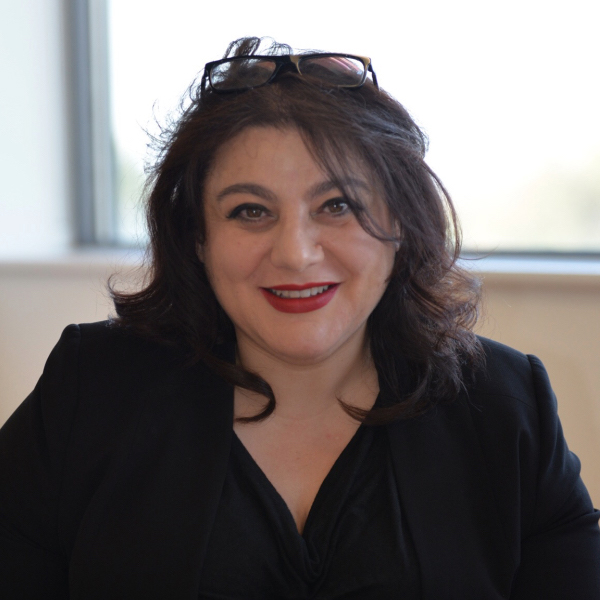
- Bissan Al-Lazikani
- Education: University College London (BSc); Imperial College London (MSc); University of Cambridge (PhD)
- Known for: Cancer drugs, Data Science, Chemogenomics, Computational Biology, Drug Discovery, Bioinformatics
- Awards: Cancer Prevention and Research Institute of Texas Scholar in Cancer Research Fellow of the Royal Society of Biology University of London Leading Women John Black Charitable Foundation-Prostate Cancer Foundation Challenge Award Victoria and Vinny Smith – Prostate Cancer Foundation Challenge Award American Association of Cancer Research (AACR) Team Science Award Howard Hughes Postdoctoral Fellowship
- Scientific career
- Workplaces: Columbia University; Inpharmatica Ltd; BioFocus DPI plc; European Bioinformatics Institute; Institute of Cancer Research; MD Anderson Cancer Center
- Doctoral advisor: Cyrus Chothia
- Notable students: Krishna Bulusu, Elizabeth Coker, Catherine Fletcher
- Website: mdanderson.elsevierpure.com/en/persons/bissan-al-lazikani

Professor Bissan Al-Lazikani PhD FRSB MBCS is a data scientist and a drug discoverer. She applies computational techniques to help solve critical bottlenecks in cancer drug discovery and development. Since 2021 she has been a Cancer Prevention and Research Institute of Texas (CPRIT) Scholar of Cancer Research and Professor of Genomic Medicine at The University of Texas MD Anderson Cancer Center.

== Education ==
She studied as an undergraduate at UCL in molecular biology. Her M.Sc in Computer Science is from Imperial College and she has a PhD in Computational Biology from Cambridge University, where she was supervised by Cyrus Chothia.

== Career ==
Professor Bissan Al-Lazikani is formally trained in molecular biology and computer science: BSc (Hons) in molecular biology from UCL, MSc in Computer Science from Imperial College then PhD in Computational Biology from the Cambridge University. Subsequently, she became a Howard Hughes postdoctoral fellow at the laboratories of Professor Barry Honig in Columbia University, New York, where she focused on structure analysis, prediction and modelling for the purpose of understanding the basis of ligand-receptor interactions. After that, she joined a London-based biotechnology company, Inpharmatica, where she led a team to develop chemogenomics databases and tools to aid target prioritisation and drug discovery. These are now available to the community via a Wellcome strategic award through the ChEMBL resources at the European Bioinformatics Institute (EBI).

She joined the Institute of Cancer Research, London, in 2009 to establish and lead the Computational Biology and Chemogenomics Team in order to innovate and apply computational techniques to cancer drug discovery, in a long-term collaboration with Professor Paul Workman FRS. She then led the creation of the world’s largest cancer knowledge base, canSAR, as well as the novel, Big Data-driven approaches for objective and systematic evaluation of therapeutic targets for cancer. She also led the creation of ProbeMiner, a data-driven Chemical Probe assessment resource. She was appointed head of the Department of Data Science at the ICR. In this role, she led the creation of The Knowledge Hub, a multidisciplinary, AI-enabled environment for clinical research and therapy stratification.

In 2021 she joined MD Anderson Cancer Center, in Houston, Texas, where she is Director of Therapeutics Data Science, Professor in the Department of Genomic Medicine and founding faculty of MD Anderson’s Institute of Data Science for Oncology (IDSO).

She jointly holds Wellcome Biomedical Resource award as well as the Director of Informatics and Technologies for the Chemical Probes Portal. She was vice-chair of the Cancer Research UK Early Detection and Diagnosis Expert Panel. She serves on numerous scientific advisory boards and funding panels, and is a Fellow of The Royal Society of Biology, and a member of the British Computer Society. She currently is Chair of the Cancer Research UK Data Advisory Board, a member of the Board of Directors for Blood Cancer United, and a member of the Scientific Committee for Fight Kids Cancer.

Her published works have specialised in drug discovery, genomics, small molecule drug discovery and new drug discovery. As of April 2022 she is associated with more than 100 scientific works, cited over 24,000 times with an impact factor of 45. She has also worked in the commercial sector, leading novel method development and applied bioinformatics teams.
