= Foldon domain =

Foldon domain is a small, approximately 30 amino acid, protein domain originally discovered on the fibritin protein of bacteriophage T4. The domain causes proteins to trimerize and is used in several biotechnology and vaccine applications.
