= Arthur M. Lesk =

Molecular biologist

Arthur Lesk FRSB
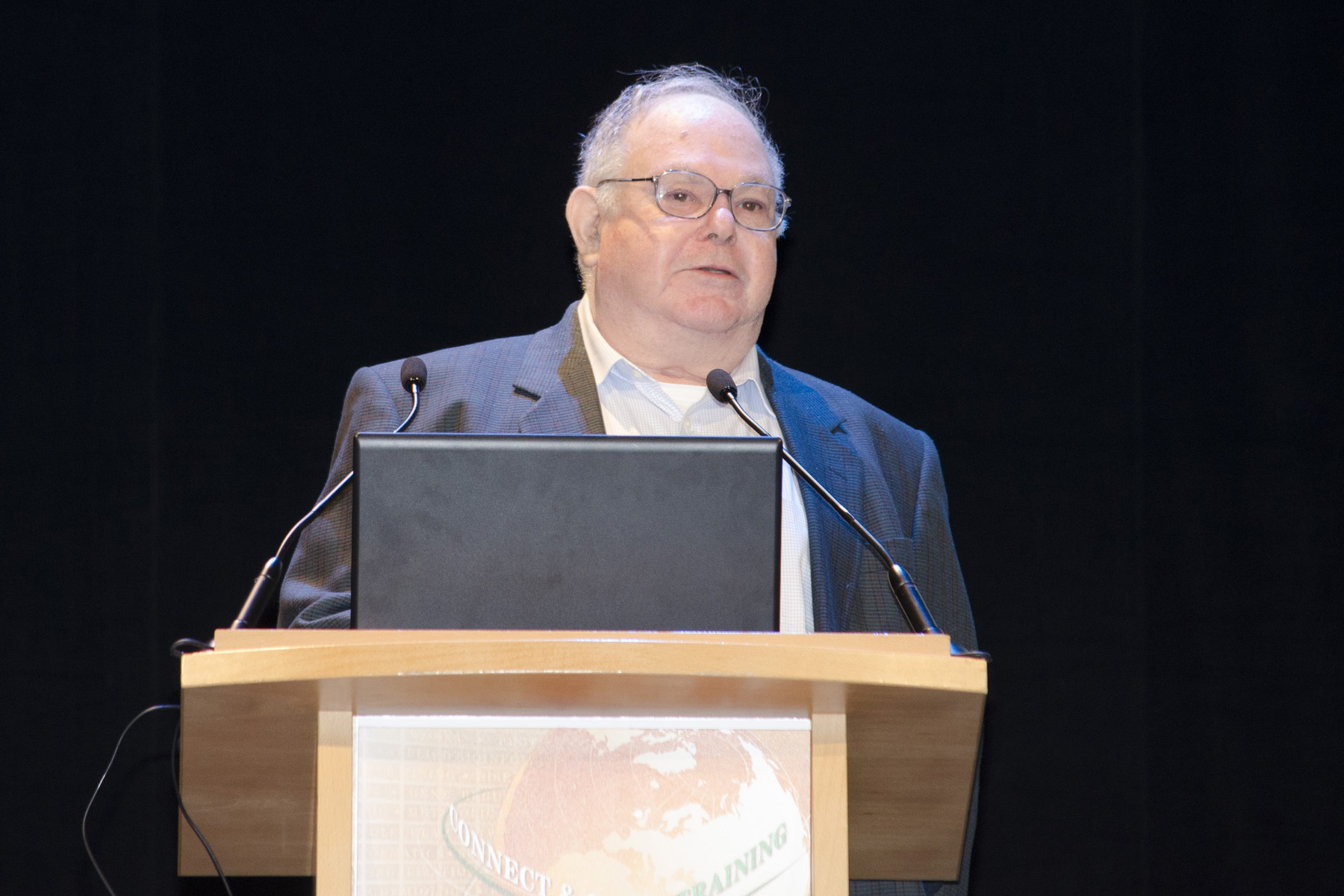
- Arthur M. Lesk speaking at the ISMB conference in 2015.
- Born: Arthur Mallay Lesk
- Education: Harvard University (BSc); University of Cambridge (MSc); Princeton University (PhD)
- Known for: Introduction to Bioinformatics and other textbooks
- Scientific career
- Workplaces: Pennsylvania State University; Laboratory of Molecular Biology; Harvard University; Princeton University; University of Cambridge; Fairleigh Dickinson University; European Molecular Biology Laboratory
- Thesis: Valence Bond Configuration Interaction Studies on the Chemical Bonding of the Noble Gases (1966)
- Website: bmb.psu.edu/directory/aml25

Arthur Mallay Lesk, is a protein science researcher, who is a professor of biochemistry and molecular biology at the Pennsylvania State University in University Park.

== Education ==
Lesk received a bachelor's degree, magna cum laude, from Harvard University in 1961. He received his doctoral degree from Princeton University in 1966. He also received a master's degree from the University of Cambridge in the United Kingdom in 1999.

== Research ==
Lesk has made significant contributions to the study of protein evolution. He and Cyrus Chothia, working at the Medical Research Council (UK) Laboratory of Molecular Biology in Cambridge, United Kingdom, discovered the relationship between changes in amino-acid sequence and changes in protein structure by analyzing the mechanism of evolution in protein families. This discovery has provided the quantitative basis for the most successful and widely used method of structure prediction, known as homology modelling.

Lesk and Chothia also studied the conformations of antigen-binding sites of immunoglobulins. They discovered the “canonical-structure model” for the conformation of the complementarity-determining regions of antibodies, and they applied this model to the analysis of antibody-germ-line genes, including the prediction of the structure of the corresponding proteins. This work has supported the “humanization” of antibodies for therapy in the treatment of cancer. “This approach to cancer therapy is based on the observation of H. Waldmann that rats can raise antibodies against human cancers, but that the rat antibodies lead to immune responses, similar to allergies, in human patients,” Lesk explains. “Humanization of these antibodies is the formation of hybrid molecules that are more human than rat, but that retain the therapeutic activity while reducing the patient’s immune response.”

Lesk's work also involves the detailed comparison of proteins in different structural states as a means for understanding the mechanisms that enable the proteins to change conformation, both as part of their normal activity and in disease. The discovery and analysis of these mechanisms was the key to understanding conformation changes in serine protease inhibitors, also known as serpins, mutations of which are an important cause of several diseases, including emphysema and certain types of inherited mental illness.

Lesk used a systematic analysis of protein-folding patterns to develop a mathematical representation that aids in the recognition and classification of these patterns. He also wrote the first computer program to generate schematic diagrams of proteins using molecular graphics, and he developed many algorithms now used by other researchers to analyze the structures of proteins.

Lesk has served as chair of the Task Group on Biological Macromolecules for the Committee on Data for Science and Technology (CODATA), which aimed to foster worldwide coordination of databases in molecular biology to enhance their quality and utility. He has given invited lectures and presentations related to his research at universities and professional conferences worldwide.

Lesk is a member of the American Physical Society. He has published 189 scientific articles and 10 books related to his research.

Prior to joining Penn State during the fall semester of 2003, Lesk was on the faculty of the clinical school at the University of Cambridge from 1990 to 2003. He was a group leader in the biocomputing program at the European Molecular Biology Laboratory in Heidelberg, Germany, from 1987 to 1990; a visiting scientist at MRC Laboratory of Molecular Biology in Cambridge, United Kingdom, between 1977 and 1990; and a professor of chemistry at Fairleigh Dickinson University in New Jersey from 1971 to 1987. He has held visiting fellowships at the University of Otago in New Zealand and Monash University in Australia. He also is a Life Member of Clare Hall, Cambridge in the United Kingdom.

In 2023 Lesk was awarded the Carl Brändén Award. The award honors an outstanding protein scientist who has also made exceptional contributions in the areas of education and/or service to the field.

== Schematic diagrams of protein structures ==
Lesk, along with Karl D. Hardman, wrote one of the first computer programs for generating the schematic diagram of protein structure. It is known to produce one of the best representations of the protein structures and employs the classification scheme for Ribbon Diagrams created by Jane Richardson. Most of the protein structure illustrations in Lesk's book (see reference list below) are generated using this program. Although these schematic diagrams are less detailed compared to other representations, such as pictures simulating wire models or space-filling models, the simplifications make them more effective in presenting the topological relationships among elements of secondary structure of the proteins. This was then further improved by creating a program to produce stereoscopic pairs of diagrams. As a result, the viewer's ability to perceive spatial relationship in complex molecules was enhanced.

The basic operation of the program begins with the execution of line drawing. There are four phases involved in this program:

1. The input phase – Program reads the input files. There are two input files. They are the coordinates and the details of the contents and appearance of the picture.
2. Picture generation – Geometric transformation of coordinates are generated by the program into picture elements. For example, a cylinder of appropriate size and orientation about the z-axis represents α-helix; each peptide plane is determined for Ribbon Diagrams and β-sheets; and spline fit is used for curved sheets.
3. Hidden-line removal – This step is only required by the cylinders of α-helices and the arrows of β-sheets, not skeletal models. Picture of these structures are classified by three levels of “optical density” – transparent, translucent, or opaque. If lines are passing behind the transparent object, it is not changed. If it passes behind a translucent object, it is altered into dashed lines. If it is opaque, the lines passing through the object are removed completely. This step can be replaced with an alternative step to create a Colour-Raster Output. The lines are ignored and the windows are painted according to the user.
4. Output – Character strings are extended to sets of line segments through a set of stroke tables. Line segments are placed into the two-dimensional space.

== Personal life ==
Arthur Lesk's son, Victor Lesk, followed his father into the field of structural biology and bioinformatics, and has held a post-doctoral research position with Michael Sternberg at Imperial College London. His daughter, Valerie Lesk, is an academic in the Division of Psychology at the University of Bradford, UK.
