= Cofactor transferase family =

Cofactor transferase domain
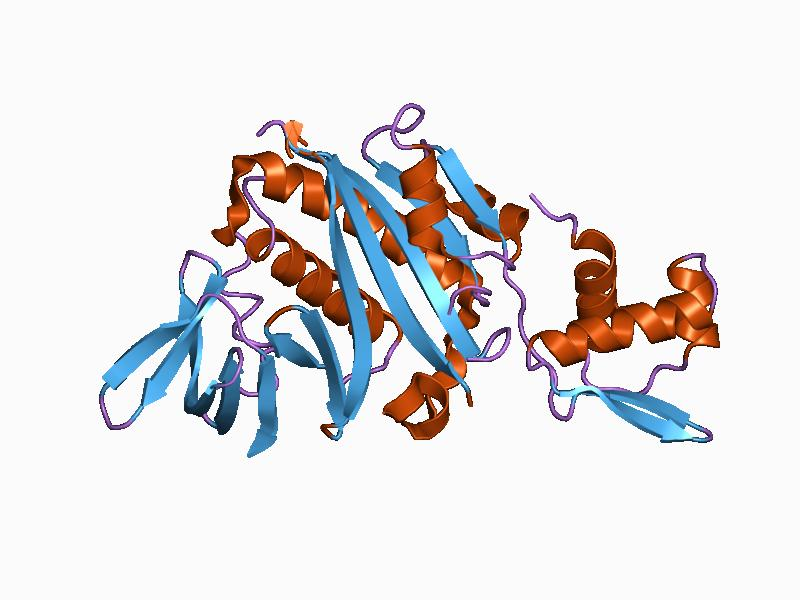
- The three-dimensional structure of BirA, the repressor of the Escherichia coli biotin biosynthetic operon.

Identifiers
- Symbol: BPL
- Pfam: PF03099
- InterPro: IPR004143
- SCOP2: 1bia / SCOPe / SUPFAM
Available protein structures:
- PDB: IPR004143 PF03099 (ECOD; PDBsum)
- AlphaFold: IPR004143; PF03099

Bacterial lipoate protein ligase C-terminus
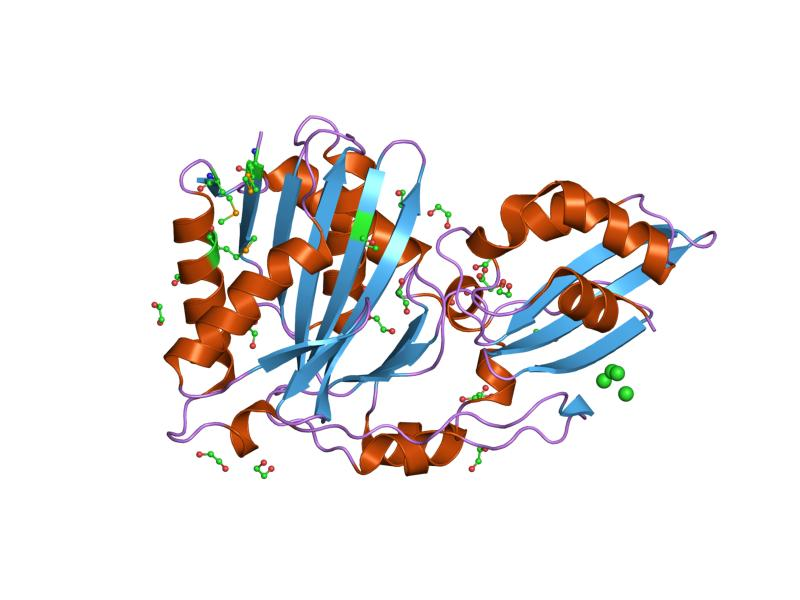
- crystal structure of putative lipoate-protein ligase (np_345629.1) from streptococcus pneumoniae tigr4 at 1.99 a resolution

Identifiers
- Symbol: Lip_prot_lig_C
- Pfam: PF10437
- InterPro: IPR019491
Available protein structures:
- PDB: IPR019491 PF10437 (ECOD; PDBsum)
- AlphaFold: IPR019491; PF10437

Biotin protein ligase C terminal domain

Identifiers
- Symbol: BPL_C
- Pfam: PF02237
- Pfam clan: CL0206
- InterPro: IPR003142
- SCOP2: 1bia / SCOPe / SUPFAM
Available protein structures:
- PDB: IPR003142 PF02237 (ECOD; PDBsum)
- AlphaFold: IPR003142; PF02237

In molecular biology, the Cofactor transferase family is a family of protein domains that includes biotin protein ligases, lipoate-protein ligases A, octanoyl-(acyl carrier protein):protein N-octanoyltransferases, and lipoyl-protein:protein N-lipoyltransferases. The metabolism of the cofactors Biotin and lipoic acid share this family. They also share the target modification domain (Pfam PF00364), and the sulfur insertion enzyme (Pfam PF04055).

Biotin protein ligase (BPL) is the enzyme responsible for attaching biotin to a specific lysine at the biotin carboxyl carrier protein. Each organism likely has only one BPL protein. Biotin attachment is a two step reaction that results in the formation of an amide linkage between the carboxyl group of biotin and the epsilon-amino group of the modified lysine. Biotin attachment is required for biotin biosynthesis and utilization of free biotin.

Lipoate-protein ligase catalyses the formation of an amide linkage between lipoic acid and a specific lysine residue of the lipoyl domain of lipoate dependent enzymes. They are required for the utilization of free lipoic acid.

Octanoyl-(acyl carrier protein):protein N-octanoyltransferases, or octanoyltransferases, are required for lipoic acid biosynthesis. They transfer octanoate from the acyl carrier protein (ACP), part of fatty acid biosynthesis, to the specific lysine residue of lipoyl domains. Two octanoyltransferase isozymes exist in this superfamily.

Lipoyl-protein:protein N-lipoyltransferases, or lipoylamidotransferases, are required for lipoic acid metabolism in some organisms. They transfer lipoic acid or octanoate from lipoyl domains and transfer to other lipoyl domains. In Bacillus subtilis, the transfer is from the glycine cleavage system H protein, GcvH, to other lipoyl domains. This is because the octanoyltransferase of B. subtilis is specific for GcvH.

== Structure ==
Octanoyltransferases and lipoyl-amidotransferases are single domain enzymes. Characterized lipoate protein ligases require an additional accessory domain (Pfam PF10437) to adenylate the acyl substrate. Biotin protein ligases have an additional C-terminal domain which participates in biotin adenylation and dimerization. Biotin protein ligases may also have an additional N-terminal domain required for DNA binding, although this domain is not always present.
