= Werner G. Krebs =

American data scientist

- Born: c. 1977
- Education: Ph.D. Yale University S.B./S.M. University of Chicago
- Employer(s): Acculation, Inc.
- Known for: Database of Molecular Motions, GNU Queue
- Awards: Salzburg Global Fellow, Founder Institute Graduate, IBM Global Entrepreneur
- Scientific career
- Workplaces: San Diego Supercomputer Center; University of California, San Diego; Yale University; University of Chicago
- Thesis: Database of Macromolecular Motions
- Doctoral advisor: Mark Gerstein
- Other academic advisors: James Heckman; Keith Moffat; Philip Bourne
- Website: https://www.acculation.com/werner-g-krebs-ph-d-speaker-

Werner G. Krebs (born c. 1977) is an American data scientist. He is currently CEO of data science and artificial intelligence startup Acculation, Inc. and has previously held positions at what are now Virtu Financial, Bank of America, and the San Diego Supercomputer Center.

He was initially hired out of high school by the Nobel Laureate James Heckman. A graduate of the University of Chicago and University of Chicago Laboratory Schools, he is a Salzburg Global Fellow, Founder Institute Graduate, and IBM Global Entrepreneur. He resides in Los Angeles.

Krebs and his work have been discussed in news articles in journals, newspapers, books, encyclopedias, official government publications, and internationally in multiple languages over a period spanning more than one decade.

Amongst other things, he is noted for the Database of Molecular Motions which was developed with Mark Gerstein while a PhD Candidate at Yale University. He has also been noted as the original author of GNU Queue, a 2000s-era load balancing and parallel processing system with a simplified in-line interface. Although GNU Queue was decommissioned in 2015 in favor of GNU Parallel, it was originally described in 1998 as having some functionality similar to LSF, which at the time was closed source commercial software. A simplified version of LSF was later open sourced circa 2007, eventually named OpenLava and under a GPL license compatible with GNU Queue. Thus, both GNU Parallel and OpenLava may be considered related GPL’d projects, although the latter is not formally a GNU project. He was an academic, on the faculty at UCSD.

== See also ==
- Database of Macromolecular Motions
- List of free and open-source software packages
