= Domine Lomovšek =

Yugoslav and Slovenian ice hockey player

- Born: September 13, 1954 (age 70); Ljubljana, Yugoslavia
- Height: 5 ft 7 in (170 cm)
- Weight: 168 lb (76 kg; 12 st 0 lb)
- Position: Goaltender
- Played for: HDD Olimpija Ljubljana; HK Partizan; Medveščak Zagreb
- National team: Yugoslavia and Slovenia
- NHL draft: Undrafted
- Playing career: 1983–1993

Dominik Lomovšek (born September 13, 1954), is a former Yugoslav ice hockey goaltender. He played for the Yugoslavia men's national ice hockey team at the 1984 Winter Olympics in Sarajevo.
