= Database of protein conformational diversity =

PCDB

Content
- Description: Protein conformational diversity.

Contact
- Research center: Universidad Nacional de Quilmes
- Laboratory: Centro de Estudios e Investigaciones
- Authors: Ezequiel I Juritz
- Primary citation: Juritz & al. (2011)
- Release date: 2010

Access
- Website: http://www.pcdb.unq.edu.ar

The Database of protein conformational diversity (PCDB) is a database of diversity of protein tertiary structures within protein domains as determined by X-ray crystallography. Proteins are inherently flexible and this database collects information on this subject for use in molecular research. It uses the CATH database as a source of structures for each protein and reports the range of differences in the structures based on their superposition and reports a maximum RMSD. The interface for the database allows researchers to find proteins with a range of conformational flexibility allowing them to find highly flexible proteins for example. The database is run and maintained by a group of researchers based at the Universidad Nacional de Quilmes in Argentina.

== See also ==
- Crystallography
- Protein structure
