= Edward Marcotte =

Edward Marcotte is a professor of biochemistry at The University of Texas at Austin, working in genetics, proteomics, and bioinformatics. Marcotte is an example of a computational biologist who also relies on experiments to validate bioinformatics-based predictions.

== Education and positions ==
Marcotte's undergraduate education was at The University of Texas at Austin, where he received a B.S. in microbiology in 1990. He received his Ph.D. in biochemistry from The University of Texas at Austin in 1995, and did his postdoctoral work both at UT Austin and at University of California, Los Angeles with Professor David Eisenberg. Marcotte has been a professor at UT Austin since 2001.

== Research ==
Marcotte's major research contributions are in the areas of bioinformatics, proteomics, systems biology, and synthetic biology.

=== Bioinformatics and systems biology ===
In early work, Marcotte and colleagues created the first genome-scale map of functional links among proteins in any complex organism (the yeast Saccharomyces cerevisiae), an approach that allowed them to predict the function to more than half of all uncharacterized yeast proteins. Marcotte also developed several methods of identifying functional interactions between proteins, including phylogenetic profiling, Rosetta Stone gene fusion, mRNA coexpression, and mirror tree approaches.

In 2010, Marcotte and colleagues identified an algorithm for identifying cases of deep homology based on phenotype.

=== Proteomics ===
In the field of proteomics, Marcotte's contributions include developing early versions of the human protein interaction network and mapping of >7,000 human protein interactions. Marcotte and colleagues developed the spotted cell microarray technique for high-throughput measurement of protein expression, subcellular location, and function, developed algorithms for analyzing mass spectrometry data, started an open access database for mass spectrometry proteomics data, and developed the APEX method for absolute protein quantification on a proteome-wide scale. Using APEX, Marcotte and colleagues demonstrated that protein abundance in a lower eukaryote is predominantly determined by mRNA levels, while human protein abundances are determined roughly equally by transcriptional and post-transcriptional regulation.
