= Domine Database =

DOMINE

Content
- Description: comprehensive collection of known and predicted domain-domain interactions.

Contact
- Research center: National Institute of Environmental Health Sciences, National Institutes of Health
- Laboratory: Systems Biology
- Primary citation: Yellaboina et al. (2011)
- Release date: 2010

Access
- Website: https://manticore.niehs.nih.gov/domine

DOMINE is a database of known and predicted protein domain interactions (or domain-domain interactions). It contains interactions observed in PDB crystal structures, and those predicted by several computational approaches. DOMINE uses Pfam HMM profiles for protein domain definitions. The DOMINE database contains 26,219 interactions among 5,410 domains, which includes 6,634 known interactions inferred from PDB structure data.

== See also ==
- DOMINE database
