= Julian Gough (scientist) =

- Born: Julian John Thurstan Gough; September 1974 (age 51)
- Education: The Perse School
- Alma mater: University of Bristol (BSc); University of Cambridge (PhD)
- Known for: Superfamily database
- Relatives: Douglas Gough (father); Charles Thurstan Shaw (grandfather)
- Scientific career
- Fields: Bioinformatics; Computational Biology; Molecular Biology; Genomics
- Institutions: University of Bristol; RIKEN; Stanford University; Tokyo Medical and Dental University; Pasteur Institute; Laboratory of Molecular Biology (LMB); GeneTrainer Ltd.; Mogrify Ltd.; OutSee Ltd.
- Thesis: Hidden Markov models and their application to the genome analysis in the context of protein structure (2001)
- Doctoral advisor: Cyrus Chothia
- Website: outsee.co.uk

Julian John Thurstan Gough (born 1974) was a Group Leader in the Laboratory of Molecular Biology (LMB) of the Medical Research Council (MRC). He was previously a professor of bioinformatics at the University of Bristol.

== Education ==
Gough was educated at The Perse School in Cambridge and the University of Bristol where he was awarded a joint honours degree in Mathematics and Physics in 1998. He went on to complete his PhD in the Laboratory of Molecular Biology (LMB) supervised by Cyrus Chothia on genome analysis and protein structure as a postgraduate student of Sidney Sussex College, Cambridge, graduating in 2001.

== Career and research ==
Following his PhD, Gough completed postdoctoral research at the LMB and Stanford University, with Michael Levitt. Subsequently, he was a scientist at RIKEN in Tokyo, a Professor member of faculty in the Computer Science department at the University of Bristol, where he worked from 2007-2017, and then a programme leader at the MRC Laboratory of Molecular Biology in Cambridge until 2023. He has also been a visiting scientist at the Pasteur Institute in Paris and an associate professor at Tokyo Medical and Dental University. Gough is currently CEO and founder of OutSee Limited, an AI genomics company in Cambridge, winner of the Cambridge Independent Science and Technology Awards 2025 "Start-up of the Year".

Gough's research interests are in bioinformatics, computational biology, molecular biology, genomics which has led to the creation of the Superfamily database of Hidden Markov models (HMMs) representing all proteins of known structure. His research has been published in leading peer reviewed scientific journals including Nature, Science, Cell, Nucleic Acids Research, PNAS, the Biochemical Journal, the Journal of Molecular Biology, Genome Research, Bioinformatics, PLOS Genetics, Nature Genetics and the Journal of Bacteriology.

Gough's research has been funded by the Biotechnology and Biological Sciences Research Council (BBSRC), the Engineering and Physical Sciences Research Council (EPSRC), the Natural Environment Research Council (NERC), the European Union (EU) Seventh Research Framework Programme (FP7), the Japan Society for the Promotion of Science (JSPS) and the Royal Society of London.
