= Hermite spline =

Spline curve where each polynomial of the spline is in Hermite form

In the mathematical subfield of numerical analysis, a Hermite spline is a spline curve where each polynomial of the spline is in Hermite form.

== See also ==
- Cubic Hermite spline
- Hermite polynomials
- Hermite interpolation
