= Deep homology =

Control of growth and differentiation by deeply conserved genetic mechanisms

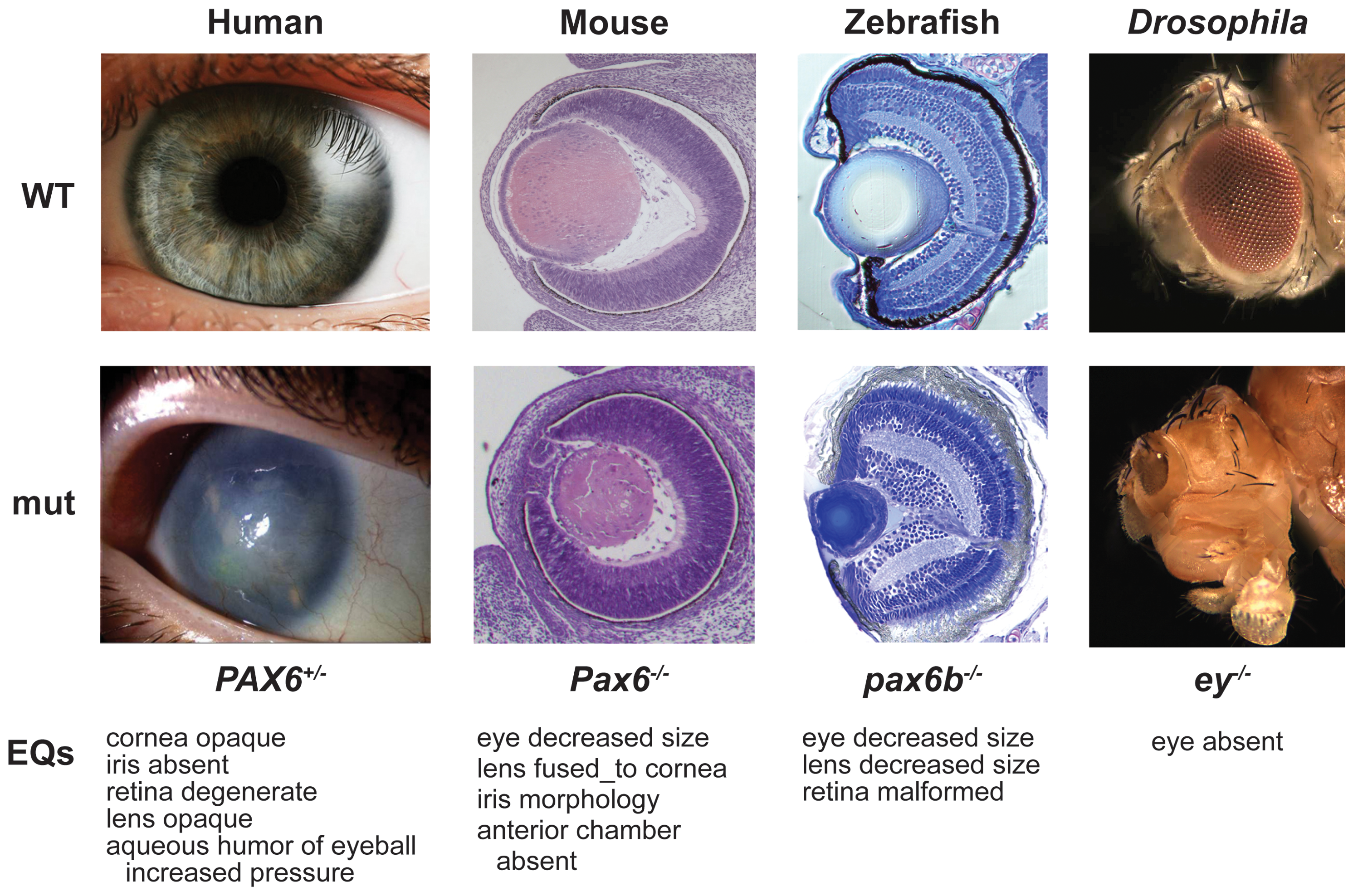
pax6 alterations result in similar phenotypic alterations of eye morphology and function across a wide range of species.

In evolutionary developmental biology, the concept of deep homology is used to describe cases where growth and differentiation processes are governed by genetic mechanisms that are homologous and deeply conserved across a wide range of species.

Deep homology on the molecular level may correspond to a range of relationships between the processes they enable, including analogy/convergent, homoplasy/parallel, and true homology. In the two former cases, these processes are attributed to independent exaptation (co-option) of the same underlying genetic mechanism. Determining the nature of each case of observed deep homology and "where homology ends and novelty begins" often requires extended taxonomic sampling using living or fossil species.

== History ==
In 1822, the French zoologist Étienne Geoffroy Saint-Hilaire dissected a crayfish, discovering that its body is organised like a vertebrate's, but inverted belly to back (dorsoventrally):

I just found that all the soft organs, that is to say, the principal organs of life are found in crustaceans, and so in insects, in the same order, in the same relationships and with the same arrangement as their analogues in the high vertebrate animals ... What was my surprise, and I may add, my admiration, seeing [such] a rule ...

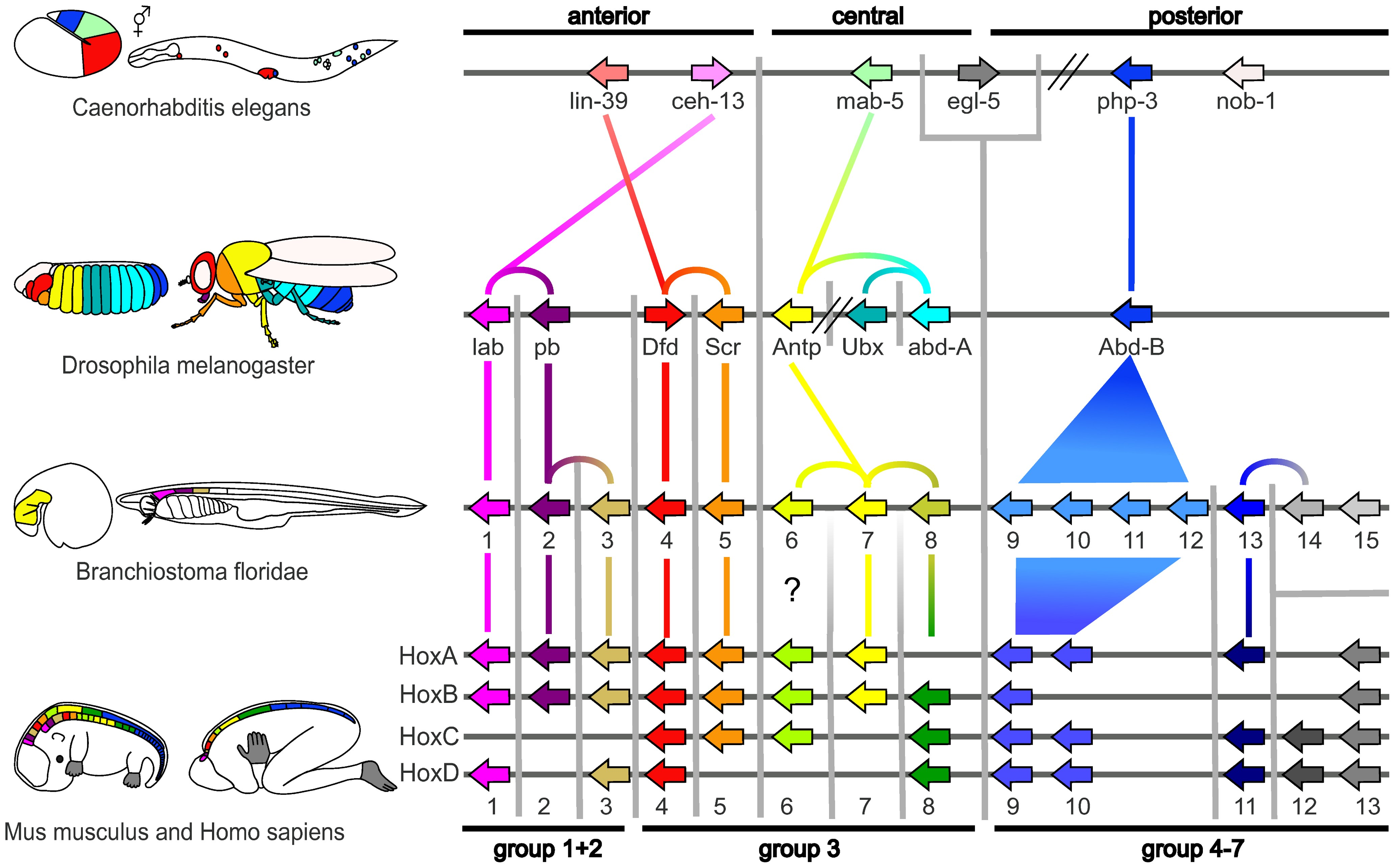
Homologous hox genes in such different animals as insects and vertebrates control embryonic development and hence the form of adult bodies. These genes have been highly conserved through hundreds of millions of years of evolution.

Geoffroy's homology theory was denounced by the leading French zoologist of his day, Georges Cuvier, but in 1994, Geoffroy was shown to be correct. In 1915, Santiago Ramon y Cajal mapped the neural connections of the optic lobes of a fly, finding that these resembled those of vertebrates. In 1978, Edward B. Lewis helped to found evolutionary developmental biology, discovering that homeotic genes regulated embryonic development in fruit flies.

In 1997, the term deep homology first appeared in a paper by Neil Shubin, Cliff Tabin, and Sean B. Carroll, describing the apparent relatedness in genetic regulatory apparatuses which indicated evolutionary similarities in disparate animal features.

== Difference from ordinary homology ==
Whereas ordinary homology is seen in the pattern of structures such as limb bones of mammals that are evidently related, deep homology can apply to groups of animals that have quite dissimilar anatomy: vertebrates (with endoskeletons made of bone and cartilage) and arthropods (with exoskeletons made of chitin) nevertheless have limbs that are constructed using similar recipes or "algorithms".

Within the metazoa, homeotic genes control differentiation along major body axes. One of these are the hox genes where the anterior-posterior patterning function is generally considered truly homologous. HoxA and HoxD (especially HOXA13 and HOXD13), that regulate finger and toe formation in mammals, control the development of ray fins in zebrafish; these structures had until then been considered non-homologous. Still, there remains a doubt in whether this is a case of parallel evolution or true homology, especially as the structures appear to originate from different germ layers. A 2020 study found that there are overlaps in cell types that make fins and fingers, suggesting that they may actually arise from the same ancestor structure. In addition, a 2026 study finds that the cell population underlying the repeating structure of fins and gills and that one can substitute for another, a case of serial homology.

Pax genes (especially PAX6) help to control the development of the eye and other sensory organs. The deep homology applies across widely separated groups, such as in the eyes of mammals and the structurally quite different compound eyes of insects. The commonly-accepted explanation of the shared role of Pax6 is that it reflects an ancestral kind of light-sensing, opsin-expressing, microvillar-type cell that evolved into the light-detecting cells of insects and squids and the retinal ganglion cells of vertebrates.

There is a possible deep homology among animals that use acoustic communication, such as songbirds and humans, in their use of the FOXP2 gene and broader parts of the gene regulatory network. Because this trait is not shared by the presumed common ancestor, it is a case of parallel evolution. However, it has been suggested that the ancestral trait may be a capability that can smoothly evolve into acoustic communication: for example, fish are known to swim in schools, and it is possible that this behavior evolved into vocal function. Proof of FOXP2 involvement in fish schooling behavior would be needed to substantiate this speculation.

== In cancer stem cells ==
In modern day biology, the depth of understanding deep homology has evolved into focusing on the molecular and genetic mechanisms and functions rather than simple morphology. Cancer stem cells (CSCs) are a population of cells within a tumor that have the ability to self-renew and differentiate into different cell types, similar to normal stem cells. The stem cell theory of cancer suggests that there is a subpopulation of cells, referred to as cancer stem cells, that have certain characteristics that make them unique among other types of cells within a cancer. The traits that are included in CSCs are that they multiply indefinitely, are resistant to chemotherapy, and are proposed to be responsible for relapse after therapy.

=== Life cycle of cancer ===
The unicellular life cycle of cancer and Entamoeba is uniquely similar, and thus contradicts the molecular phylostratigraphic theory for the origin of cancer. This deep relationship between the two cell systems is supported by the "amoeba model", which provides a greater understanding of the biology of cancer from the evolutionary perspective. The G + S life cycle of Entamoeba is the closest common ancestor than compared to any other life cycle of unicellular organisms. Similarly, both cell systems, amoeba and cancer, use the deep homologous G + S gene module that was evolved by a common ancestor. Some parallels that they share are too close for coincidence including:

- A reproductive asexual germ-line capable of forming germ-line stem cells (GSCs, referred to as CSCs in cancer) and a somatic cell line without reproductive GSC function;
- Germ and soma cells that proliferate through asymmetric and symmetric cell cycles and can interconvert by transitioning from germ to soma (GST) and from soma to germ (SGT); both processes are referred to as MET and EMT in cancer;
- Oxygen-sensitive germlines that irreversibly lose their reproductive function due to irreparable DNA damage caused by excess oxygen;
- DNA damage repair (DDR) mechanisms to repair DNA replication and polyploidization defects and maintain genomic integrity of nascent GSCs/CSCs;
- DNA DSB repair mechanisms via MGRS and PGCC structures, with or without homologous cell fusion.

MGRSs are also known in medical terms as "pre-existing Polypoid Giant Cancer Cells (PGCCs)" and are frequently observed in untreated cancers. In cancer, the reproductive germ-line cycle starts with a precursor cell. This cell will then polyploidize within a cell envelope. This cancer germ-line undergoes a process of development that is similar to the Entamoeba germline. A significant trace of deep homology can be found in mammalian germ-line stem cells. Based on a previous hypothesis, the germ-line is the common ancestor in somatic stem cell lineages. Daughter GSCs are the only stem cells that have the capability of passing genetic information throughout generations.

== Algorithm ==
In 2010, a team led by Edward Marcotte developed an algorithm that identifies deeply homologous genetic modules in unicellular organisms, plants, and animals based on phenotypes (such as traits and developmental defects). The technique aligns phenotypes across organisms based on orthology (a type of homology) of genes involved in the phenotypes.

== See also ==
- Body plan – Set of morphological features common to members of a phylum of animals
