= Molecular Omics =

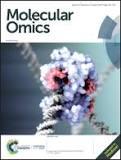
- Front cover image of Molecular Omics
- Discipline: Chemical biology
- Language: English
- Edited by: Robert L. Moritz

Publication details
- Former name: Molecular BioSystems
- History: 2005–present
- Publisher: Oxford University Press, previously Royal Society of Chemistry (United Kingdom)
- Frequency: Bimonthly
- Impact factor: 2.4 (2024)

Standard abbreviations
- ISO 4: Mol. Omics

Indexing
- ISSN: 1742-206X (print); 2515-4184 (web)
- LCCN: 2005252467
- OCLC no.: 60685787

Links
- Journal homepage; Online access

Molecular Omics is a bimonthly peer-reviewed scientific journal published by the Oxford University Press as of 2026. It covers the interface between chemistry, the "omic" sciences, and systems biology. The editor-in-chief is Robert L. Moritz (Institute for Systems Biology).

== Abstracting and indexing ==
According to the Journal Citation Reports, the journal has a 2021 impact factor of 4.212. The journal is abstracted and indexed in MEDLINE and the Science Citation Index.
