= Dominy =

Dominy is a surname. Notable people with the surname include:

- Arthur Dominy (1893–1974), English footballer and manager
- Floyd Dominy (1909–2010), Nebraska born Bureau of Reclamation Commissioner
- John Dominy (1816–1891), British horticulturist and plant hybridiser
- Dominy craftsmen, American family
