= Cyrus Chothia =

English biochemist (1942–2019)

Cyrus Chothia FRS
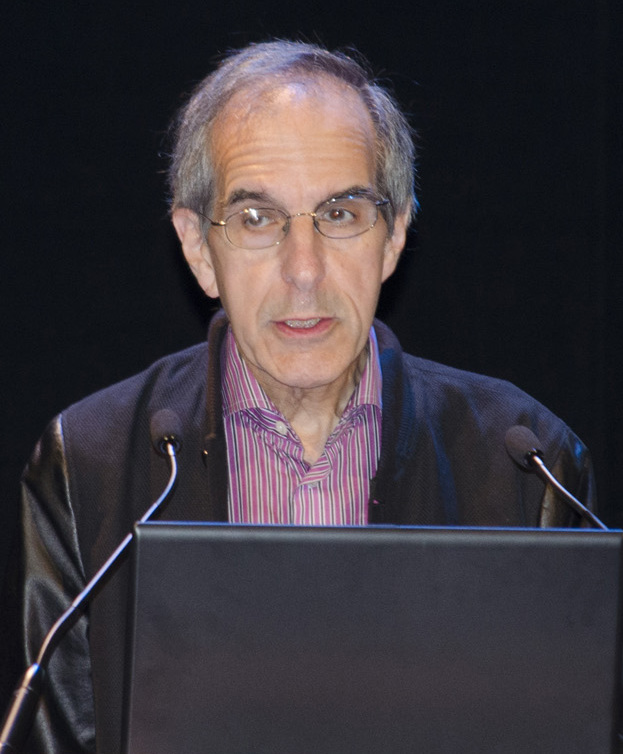
- Chothia in 2015
- Born: Cyrus Homi Chothia; 19 February 1942
- Died: 26 November 2019 (aged 77)
- Education: Alleyn's School; Durham University (BSc); University of London (MSc, PhD)
- Awards: ISCB Senior Scientist Award (2015); Dan David Prize (2015)
- Scientific career
- Workplaces: Birkbeck College; Weizmann Institute of Science; Institut Pasteur; University College London; University of Cambridge; Laboratory of Molecular Biology
- Thesis: The crystal structures of some molecules active at cholinergic nerve receptors (1973)
- Doctoral advisor: Peter J. Pauling
- Other academic advisors: Michael Levitt; Frederic M. Richards
- Doctoral students: Alex Bateman; Steven Brenner; Mark Gerstein; Julian Gough; Sarah Teichmann
- Other notable students: Arthur Lesk (postdoc)
- Website: www2.mrc-lmb.cam.ac.uk/cyrus-chothia-1942-2019

Cyrus Homi Chothia (19 February 1942 – 26 November 2019) FRS was a Parsi English biochemist who was an emeritus scientist at the Medical Research Council (MRC) Laboratory of Molecular Biology (LMB) at the University of Cambridge and emeritus fellow of Wolfson College, Cambridge.

== Education ==
Chothia was educated at Alleyn's School, then went to study at Durham University graduating with a Bachelor of Science degree in 1965. Chothia then completed a Master of Science degree at Birkbeck College in 1967 and a PhD from University College London under the supervision of Peter Pauling, the son of Linus Pauling.

== Research and career ==
After his PhD Chothia worked in the Laboratory of Molecular Biology (LMB) for three years. He then worked with Michael Levitt at the Weizmann Institute of Science followed by two years with Joel Janin at the Institut Pasteur in Paris.

In 1976 Chothia returned to England to work at University College London and the LMB. With Arthur Lesk he showed that proteins adapt to mutations by changes in structure.

In 1992 he proposed that most proteins are built of domains that come from a small number of families. He collaborated with Alexey Murzin, Steven Brenner and Tim Hubbard to create the Structural Classification of Proteins database (SCOP), a periodic table for all known protein structures. With Julian Gough he created the Superfamily database which uses Hidden Markov models to identify protein sequences that are related to those of known structures.

During his career, Chothia supervised 19 successful PhD students to completion including Alex Bateman, Steven E. Brenner, Mark Bender Gerstein, Julian Gough, Sarah Teichmann, Bissan Al-Lazikani, Goga Apic, Samantha Barré Matthew Bashton, Dan Bolser, Michael Bremang, Bernard de Bono, Emma Ganley (née Hill), Martin Madera, Siarhei Maslau, Susan Miller, Jong Park (aka Jong Bhak), Rajkumar Sasidharan, and Christine Vogel.

=== Awards and honours ===
Chothia was elected a Fellow of the Royal Society (FRS) in 2000. His certificate of election and candidature reads:

Dr Chothia has shown how the amino sequences of proteins determine their structure, function and evolution. From an analysis of their structural regularities, he has developed a classification of protein structures that is now in general use. His picture of protein evolution suggests how proteins diverge and gain new functions. He has helped us to understand how their apparently limited set of slightly different structures allow immunoglobin to recognise an almost limitless variety of different antigens.

In 2015, Chothia was elected a Fellow of the International Society for Computational Biology (ISCB) and was awarded the ISCB Accomplishment by a Senior Scientist Award in honour of his work in using computational methods to understand protein structure.

Alongside David Haussler and Michael Waterman, Chothia was awarded the 2015 Dan David Prize for his contributions to the field of bioinformatics.
