= Dominie (disambiguation) =

Dominie may refer to

- Dominie, a Scottish term for a churchman or schoolteacher
- A Minister of religion can be called a Dominie, Dom or Don
- The military version of the 1930s De Havilland Dragon Rapide aircraft
- The BAe Dominie jet trainer aircraft
- "The Dominie", a fictional character in BBV audio dramas
