= Steven E. Brenner =

American biologist and academic

Steven Brenner
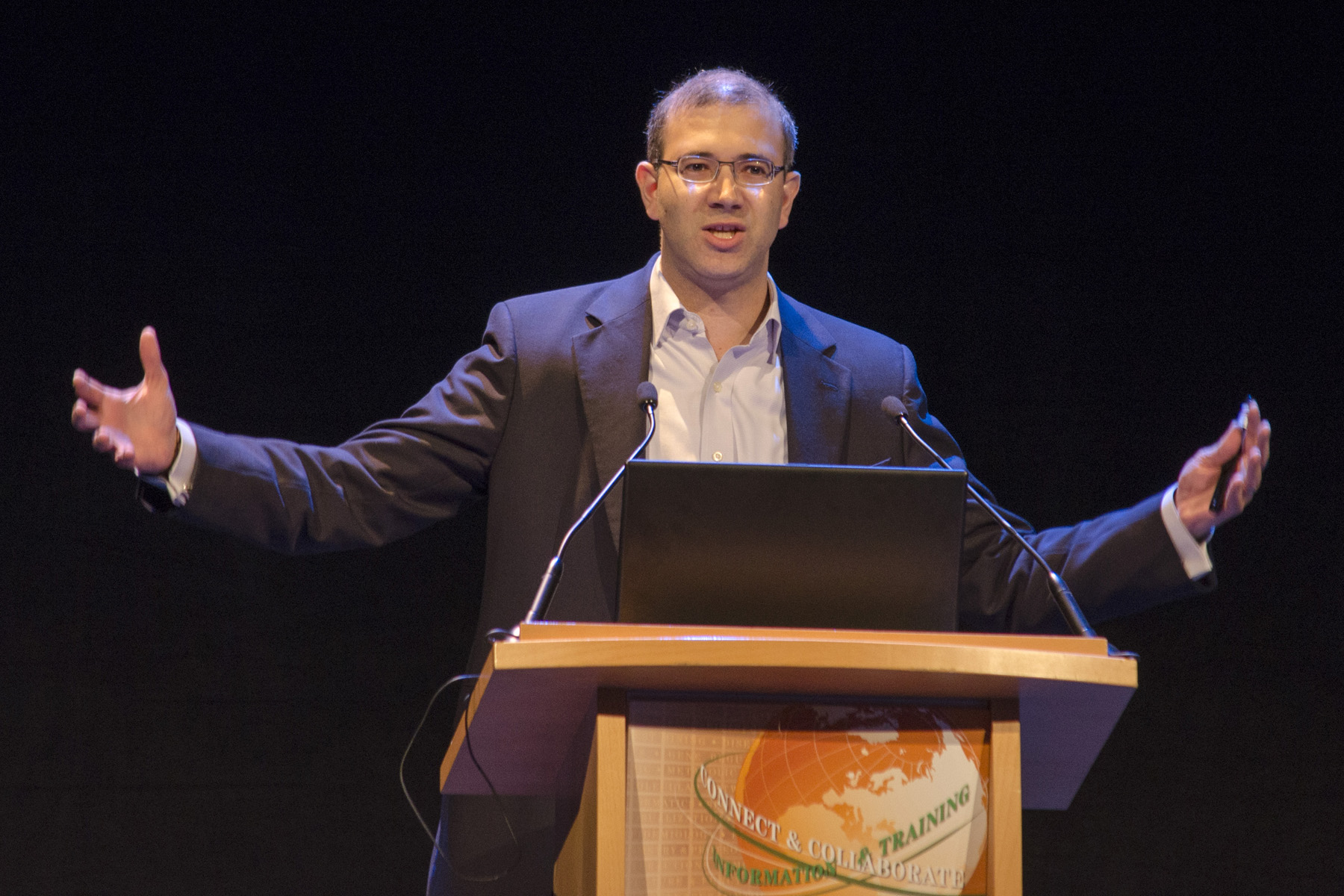
- Steven E. Brenner speaking at the ISMB conference in 2015.
- Born: Steven Elliot Brenner
- Education: Harvard University (BS); University of Cambridge (PhD)
- Known for: Structural Classification of Proteins
- Awards: Overton Prize (2010)
- Scientific career
- Workplaces: University of California, Berkeley; Laboratory of Molecular Biology, Cambridge
- Thesis: Molecular propinquity: evolutionary and structural relationships of proteins (1996)
- Doctoral advisor: Cyrus Chothia
- Website: compbio.berkeley.edu

Steven Elliot Brenner is a professor at the Department of Plant and Microbial Biology at the University of California Berkeley, adjunct professor at the Department of Bioengineering and Therapeutic Sciences at the University of California, and San Francisco Faculty scientist, Physical Biosciences at the Lawrence Berkeley National Laboratory.

== Education ==
Brenner gained his Bachelor of Arts in 1992 from Harvard University and Doctor of Philosophy in 1997 from the University of Cambridge for research supervised by Cyrus Chothia. He was one of the creators of the Structural Classification of Proteins (SCOP) database while working at the Laboratory of Molecular Biology (LMB) in Cambridge, UK.

== Career and research ==
As of 2017 research in Brenner's laboratory investigates:

- Individual genome interpretation
- The regulation of gene expression by alternative splicing and nonsense-mediated decay of messenger RNA
- Protein function prediction using Bayesian phylogenomics

=== Awards and honors ===
In 2010 he was awarded the Overton Prize from the International Society for Computational Biology.
