= Gamma helix =

Unobserved structure in protein

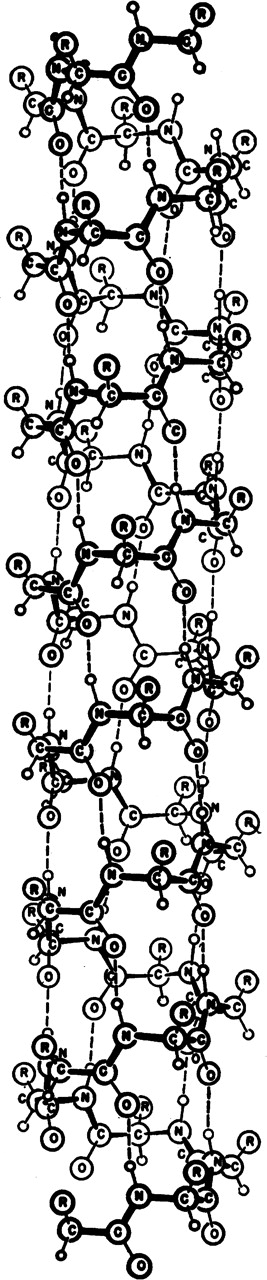
Structure of gamma helix.

Gamma helix (or γ-helix) is a type of secondary structure in proteins that has been predicted by Pauling, Corey, and Branson, but has never been observed in natural proteins. The hydrogen bond in this type of helix was predicted to be between N-H group of one amino acid and the C=O group of the amino acid six residues earlier (or, as described by Pauling, Corey, Branson, "to the fifth amide group beyond it"). This can also be described as i + 6 → i bond and would be a continuation of the series (3_{10} helix, alpha helix, pi helix and gamma helix). This theoretical helix contains 5.1 residues per turn. However, a fully developed gamma helix has characteristics of a structure that has 2.2 amino acid residues per turn, a rise of 2.75Å per residue, and a pseudo-cyclic (C7) structure closed by intramolecular H-bond. Depending on the amino acid's side chain (R) involved in this main-chain reversal motif, two stereoisomers can occur with their Cα-substituent located either in the axial or in the equatorial position relative to the H-bonded pseudo-cycle.

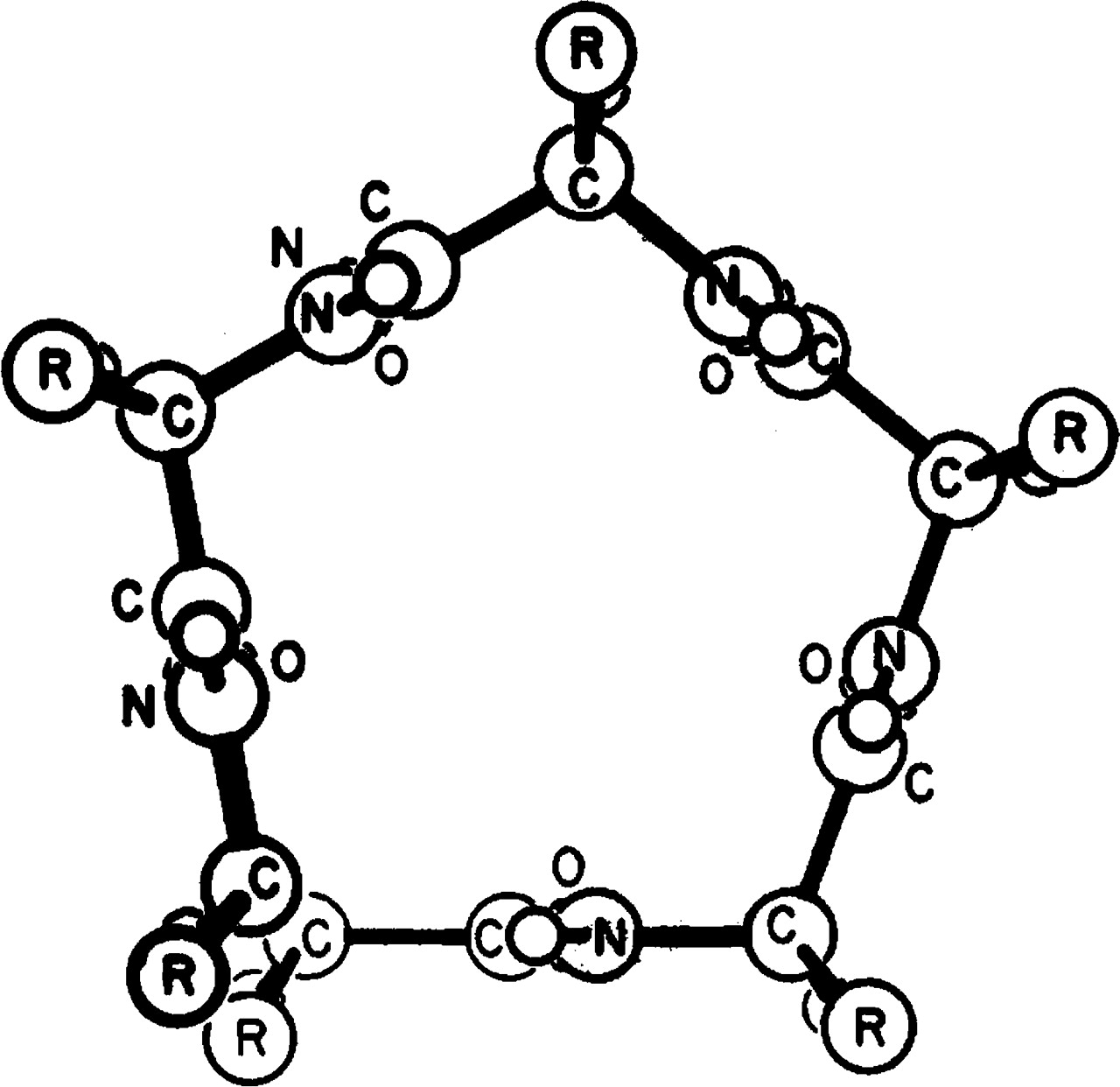
Structure of gamma helix.
