= TMEM247 =

Protein-coding gene in the species Homo sapiens

Identifiers
- Aliases: TMEM247, transmembrane protein 247
- External IDs: MGI: 1925719; HomoloGene: 54379; GeneCards: TMEM247; OMA:TMEM247 - orthologs

Gene location (Human)
Chr.	Chromosome 2 (human)
Band	2p21	Start	46,479,565 bp
Band	2p21	End	46,484,425 bp

Gene location (Mouse)
Chr.	Chromosome 17 (mouse)
Band	17|17 E4	Start	87,224,776 bp
Band	17|17 E4	End	87,229,802 bp
RNA expression pattern
Bgee	Human / Mouse (ortholog); Top expressed in: right testis; left testis; testicle; gonad; placenta; right coronary artery; human musculoskeletal system; skeletal muscle; muscle of leg; gastrocnemius muscle / Top expressed in: seminiferous tubule; spermatid; spermatocyte; pancreas; islet of Langerhans; liver; skeletal muscle tissue; thymus; More reference expression data
BioGPS	n/a
Orthologs
Species	Human	Mouse
Entrez	388946	78469
Ensembl	ENSG00000284701	ENSMUSG00000037689
UniProt	A6NEH6	Q497K7
RefSeq (mRNA)	NM_001145051	NM_001277980; NM_030104
RefSeq (protein)	NP_001138523	NP_001264909; NP_084380
Location (UCSC)	Chr 2: 46.48 – 46.48 Mb	Chr 17: 87.22 – 87.23 Mb
PubMed search
- Wikidata
View/Edit Human	View/Edit Mouse

Transmembrane protein 247 (also known as TMEM247 or transmembrane protein ENSP00000343375) is a multi-pass transmembrane protein of unknown function found in Homo sapiens encoded by the TMEM247 gene. Notable in the protein are two transmembrane regions near the c-terminus of the translated polypeptide. Transmembrane protein 247 has been found to be expressed almost entirely in the testes.

== Gene attributes ==
=== General information ===
The TMEM247 gene is located on chromosome 2 at c2p21, nucleotide: 46,479,565-46,484,425. It has three exons and two introns. TMEM247 is 4,861 nucleotides (nt) long pre-mRNA processing, reduced to 661 nt after mRNA processing and its protein product is 219 amino acids (aa) long. The gene does not include a stop codon as most genes do, but instead has a stop codon created by the process of polyadenylation during mRNA processing. Due to this, TMEM247 has no 3' UTR (untranslated region). TMEM247 codes only for one variant.

=== Promoter region ===
The promoter region of TMEM247 has a huge variety of predicted binding sites in the promoter region associated with the gene. Twenty potential interactions of interest have been collected below, though many more exist. Anchor base positions are based on distance from the start of the gene's promoter region, which itself is 1302 base pairs long.

There are a number of notable predicted binding sites on the TMEM247 promoter, as well as a notable omission. The promoter lacks a traditional TATA box, the typical binding site for proteins that recruit RNA Polymerase and begin the process of transcription. Instead, TMEM247 contains several predicted binding sites which are core promoter elements for TATA-less promoters.

TMEM247 has a promoter region that also contains a significant number of predicted development-related binding sites, such as pluripotent stem cell related factors (Oct4, Sox2, Nanog), sex-determining HMG box factors, and various homeobox/homeodomain binding sites.

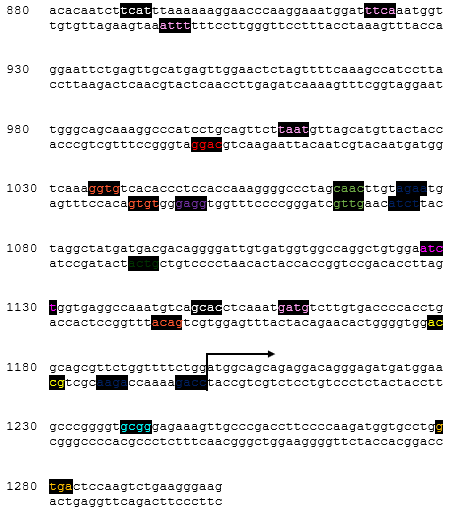
Tail end of the promoter region of the TMEM247 gene with notable predicted binding sites highlighted. The start of transcription is marked by an arrow.

Matrix	Detailed matrix information	Anchor base	Strand	Matrix similarity	Sequence
V$TBX5.01	Brachyury gene, mesoderm developmental factor	1040	(+)	1	ctacctcaaaGGTGtcacaccctccacca
V$EOMES.03	Brachyury gene, mesoderm developmental factor	1042	(-)	0.987	tttggtggagggTGTGacacctttgaggt
V$PDEF.01	Human and murine ETS1 factors (Prostate-derived Ets Factor)	998	(-)	0.974	gaactgcaGGATgggcctttg
V$RFX3.01	X-box binding factors	1064	(+)	0.974	aaggggccctagCAACttg
V$SPZ1.01	Testis-specific bHLH-Zip transcription factors (Spermatogenic Zip 1 transcription factor)	1046	(-)	0.966	tGGAGggtgtg
V$TBX20.02	Brachyury gene, mesoderm developmental factor	1149	(-)	0.939	catcatttgaggtgctGACAtttggcctc
V$HSF1.05	Heat shock factors	1198	(-)	0.938	ctgctgccatCCAGaaaaccagaac
V$MYOD.01	Myogenic regulatory factor MyoD (myf3)	1178	(-)	0.919	cgctGCCAggtggggtc
V$MTBF.01	Human muscle-specific Mt binding site	1128	(+)	0.906	tggaATCTg
V$RFX3.02	Regulatory factor X, 3 (secondary DNA binding preference)	1278	(+)	0.889	gatggtgcctgGTGActcc
V$OCT3_4.02	Motif composed of binding sites for pluripotency or stem cell factors	892	(+)	0.882	acaatctTCATttaaaaaa
V$HSF1.01	Heat shock factors	1190	(-)	0.845	atccagaaaaccAGAAcgctgccag
V$EN1.01	Homeobox transcription factors	897	(-)	0.832	gttcctttTTTAaatgaag
O$XCPE1.01	Activator-, mediator- and TBP-dependent core promoter element for RNA polymerase II transcription from TATA-less promoters	1243	(+)	0.831	gtGCGGgagaa
V$DICE.01	Downstream Immunoglobulin Control Element, critical for B cell activity and specificity	1091	(-)	0.827	tgtcGTCAtcatagc
V$ISL1.01	Lim homeodomain factors	1012	(+)	0.827	tgcagttctTAATgttagcatgt
V$RFX4.03	X-box binding factors	1064	(-)	0.814	caaGTTGctagggcccctt
V$EN1.01	Homeobox transcription factors	922	(+)	0.788	aaatggatTTCAaatggtg
V$SOX9.03	SOX/SRY-sex/testis determining and related HMG box factors	1061	(+)	0.786	caCCAAaggggccctagcaactt
V$OSNT.01	Composed binding site for Oct4, Sox2, Nanog, Tcf3 (Tcf7l1) and Sall4b in pluripotent cells	1151	(+)	0.784	aatgtcaGCACctcaaatg
V$PROX1.01	Prospero-related homeobox	1163	(+)	0.783	aatGATGtcttgt
V$SOX9.03	SOX/SRY-sex/testis determining and related HMG box factors	975	(+)	0.781	ttTCAAagccatccttatgggca
V$HSF2.03	Heat shock factors	1075	(+)	0.777	ctagcaacttgtAGAAtgtaggcta
V$HSF5.01	Heat shock factors	1074	(-)	0.764	agcctacatTCTAcaagttgctagg

== Protein attributes ==
The TMEM247 gene codes for a single protein, transmembrane protein 247 (also referred to as TMEM247). TMEM247 has two transmembrane domains at the c-terminus of the protein as part of its multi-pass transmembrane protein structure. They are identical in length at 21 amino acids each, and are separated by a span of six amino acids. TMEM247 has a predicted molecular weight of 25 kilodaltons, and a predicted isoelectric point of 5.

In composition, TMEM247 has a significantly higher amount of methionine when compared to the set of all human proteins. It also has slightly elevated levels of glutamic acid in the same analysis. The charge distribution of amino acids comprising TMEM247 is relatively uniform. Two predicted hydrophobic segments exist in the protein which match with the known two transmembrane regions.

=== Protein domains ===
Transmembrane protein 247 has two transmembrane domains. The three regions of the protein that remain are predicted to be outside of the membrane it resides in on the N- and C-terminus of the protein, while the segment between the protein's two transmembrane regions is predicted to reside inside of the membrane.

Analysis of TMEM247 predicts that it localizes in the cell at the endoplasmic reticulum. In this case, inner predicted domains would be inside the ER and outer predicted domains would reside in the cytoplasm.

A domain-level view of TMEM247 with points of interest at predicted post-translational modification sites

=== Predicted post-translational modifications ===
Transmembrane protein 247 has a variety of predicted post-translational modifications that may affect protein function. Predicted modifications include O-beta-GlcNAc attachment, Glycation, and O-glycosylation.

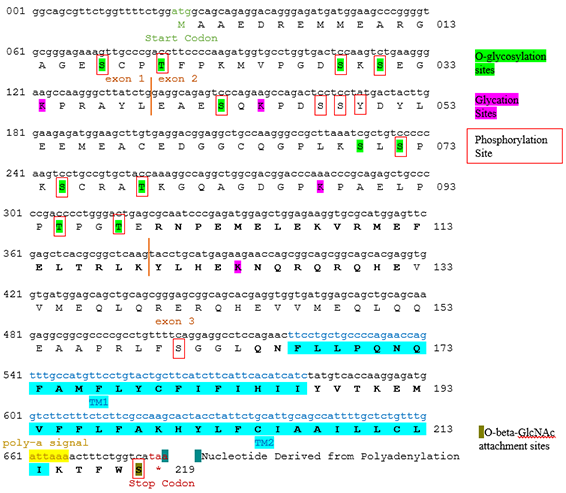
A conceptual translation of TMEM247 and predicted modifications to its protein product

==== Predicted kinase interactions ====
Protein kinases may modify transmembrane protein 247, and a variety of sites along the translated protein have been predicted to be kinase binding sites. These are represented by red squares surrounding the potential bound amino acids in the conceptual translation and listed in the table below. Predicted kinase interactions are listed in the order of the score of their prediction (higher, lower).

Amino acid position	Kinases
17	CKI
20	PKC
29	unspecified
31	unspecified
43	unspecified, DNAPK, ATM
48	unspecified
49	CKII, unspecified, DNAPK
50	unspecified
72	unspecified, cdk5, p38MAPK
75	unspecified, PKC
79	PKC, unspecified
95	cdk5, p38MAPK, GSK3
98	unspecified
161	PKA
219	PKA

=== Protein structure ===
Transmembrane protein 247 has a predicted secondary structure which includes two major features in the form of beta sheets that reside near its determined transmembrane regions. This is slightly unusual for transmembrane proteins, whose transmembrane regions are often alpha helices.

A Chou–Fasman method prediction of TMEM247's secondary protein structure

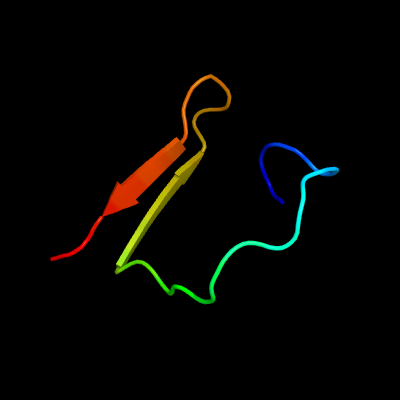
A 3D prediction of the TMEM247 secondary protein structure.

== Evolutionary history ==
=== Orthologs ===
TMEM247 has several hundred orthologs, with its most distant fully sequenced available ortholog being Anolis carolinensis. These orthologs are exclusive to land-based animals, as clades with an evolutionary origin before reptiles are not represented. The fact that TMEM247 has no relatives before the green anole makes it likely that the gene was novel when it appeared in an ancestor of the species, and was nonexistent before the evolution of reptiles. Classes represented in the orthologs include mammalia, aves, and reptilia.

Most orthologs within mammalia are strongly conserved across the entire gene, including a very highly conserved region near the center of the translated protein. The highest evolutionary conservation is centered around the transmembrane regions of the protein, which are highly conserved in all orthologous species.

Genus and species	Common name	Taxonomic group	MYA	Accession #	Sequence length (aa)	Sequence identity to humans	Sequence similarity to humans
Homo sapiens	Human	Primates	0	NP_001138523.1	219	100%	100%
Tupaia chinensis	Treeshrew	Scandentia	82	XP_006159980.1	266	74%	81%
Urocitellus parryii	Arctic ground squirrel	Rodentia	90	XP_026241536.1	224	71%	77%
Cavia porcellus	Guinea pig	Rodentia	90	XP_003472978.1	262	69%	77%
Vulpes vulpes	Red fox	Carnivora	96	XP_025848559.1	231	76%	80%
Sus scrofa	Wild boar	Artiodactyla	96	XP_003125218.3	257	74%	78%
Pteropus alecto	Black flying fox	Chiroptera	96	XP_015442982.1	280	69%	78%
Myotis lucifugus	Little brown bat	Chiroptera	96	XP_006083536.1	212	73%	78%
Lynx canadensis	Canadian lynx	Carnivora	96	XP_030167645.1	214	74%	78%
Leptonychotes weddellii	Weddell seal	Carnivora	96	XP_006740668.1	214	76%	81%
Equus caballus	Horse	Perissodactyla	96	XP_023474197.1	286	74%	78%
Enhydra lutris kenyoni	Sea otter	Carnivora	96	XP_022371955.1	214	76%	80%
Canis lupus familiaris	Dog	Carnivora	96	XP_005626294.1	231	76%	80%
Camelus ferus	Wild Bactrian camel	Artiodactyla	96	XP_032353339.1	276	73%	78%
Bos taurus	Cattle	Artiodactyla	96	NP_001070537.2	217	73%	78%
Bos indicus × Bos taurus	Hybrid cattle	Artiodactyla	96	XP_027410252.1	258	73%	78%
Loxodonta africana	African bush elephant	Proboscideans	105	XP_023413034.1	265	73%	78%
Echinops telfairi	Lesser hedgehog tenrec	Afrosoricida	105	XP_004700102.1	217	70%	77%
Pelodiscus sinensis	Softshell turtle	Testudines	312	XP_006125563.2	184	46%	60%
Columba livia	Pigeon	Columbiformes	312	XP_021154517.1	195	44%	62%
Chelonia mydas	Green sea turtle	Testudines	312	XP_027681026.1	213	38%	55%
Antrostomus carolinensis	Chuck-will's-widow	Caprimulgiformes	312	XP_028940116.1	154	38%	52%
Anolis carolinensis	Green anole	Squamata	312	XP_008115619.1	223	33%	50%

=== Paralogs ===
In humans, TMEM247 has a single paralog (hCG17037) that has a sequence which theoretically would translate into a protein which is identical to that produced by TMEM247 aside from seven positions constituting a 96.8% similarity, including two deletions that reduce the total amino acid count from 219 to 217. The extreme similarity of the TMEM247 gene and its paralog make it a likely result of gene duplication.

==== Paralog alignment ====
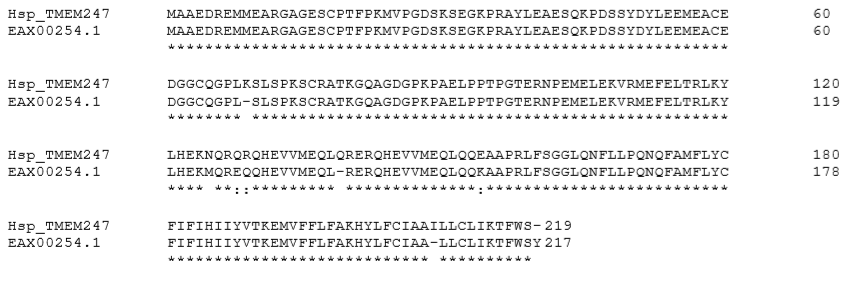
CLUSTAL O(1.2.4) multiple sequence alignment of TMEM247 and its paralog, hCG17037

== Significance/function ==
TMEM247 has no major known effects or uses in a clinical setting. There are several studies that indicate TMEM247, despite being found almost exclusively in the testes, does not play a significant role in reproduction. Further studies have revealed an association with variants in TMEM247 and coronary artery disease, though not of major significance.

A mutation in TMEM247 has been noted to be unusually common in populations of Tibetan highlanders. The exact mutation is rs116983452, a change at nucleotide position 248 in the gene from cystine to tyrosine, which causes a missense in the protein product of alanine to valine.

While the function of TMEM247 is unknown, it is notable for its polyadenylation-synthesized stop codon. Some research has shown that genes which rely on polyadenylation for the creation of stop codons are relatively common in a human parasite, Blastocystis.
