= Helical wheel =

Protein structure visual representation

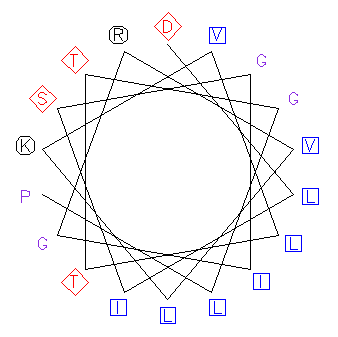
An example of an amino acid sequence plotted on a helical wheel. Aliphatic residues are shown as blue squares, polar or negatively charged residues as red diamonds, and positively charged residues as black octagons.

A helical wheel is a type of plot or visual representation used to illustrate the properties of alpha helices in proteins.

The sequence of amino acids that make up a helical region of the protein's secondary structure are plotted in a rotating manner where the angle of rotation between consecutive amino acids is 100°, so that the final representation looks down the helical axis.

== Polarity and characteristics ==
The plot reveals whether hydrophobic amino acids are concentrated on one side of the helix, usually with polar or hydrophilic amino acids on the other. This arrangement is common in alpha helices within globular proteins, where one face of the helix is oriented toward the hydrophobic core and one face is oriented toward the solvent-exposed surface. Specific patterns characteristic of protein folds and protein docking motifs are also revealed, as in the identification of leucine zipper dimerization regions and coiled coils. This projection diagram is often called and "Edmundson wheel" after its inventor.

== Drawing helical wheels ==
Helical wheels can be drawn by a variety of software packages including helixvis in R, heliquest in R, or via the HELIQUEST server.
