= WBP1 =

Protein-coding gene in the species Homo sapiens

Available structures
PDB	Ortholog search: PDBe RCSB
PDB	List of PDB id codes 1JMQ, 1K5R

Identifiers
- Aliases: WBP1, WBP-1, WW domain binding protein 1
- External IDs: OMIM: 606961; MGI: 104710; HomoloGene: 8267; GeneCards: WBP1; OMA:WBP1 - orthologs

Gene location (Human)
Chr.	Chromosome 2 (human)
Band	2p13.1	Start	74,458,400 bp
Band	2p13.1	End	74,460,891 bp

Gene location (Mouse)
Chr.	Chromosome 6 (mouse)
Band	6|6 C3	Start	83,096,025 bp
Band	6|6 C3	End	83,098,540 bp
RNA expression pattern
Bgee	Human / Mouse (ortholog); Top expressed in: right uterine tube; pituitary gland; amygdala; nucleus accumbens; anterior pituitary; putamen; caudate nucleus; right adrenal cortex; hippocampus proper; left lobe of thyroid gland / Top expressed in: choroid plexus of fourth ventricle; external carotid artery; ventricular zone; internal carotid artery; vestibular sensory epithelium; ganglionic eminence; neural tube; medial ganglionic eminence; neural layer of retina; maxillary prominence; More reference expression data
BioGPS	n/a
Gene ontology
Molecular function	protein binding; WW domain binding
Cellular component	cellular component
Biological process	biological process
Sources:Amigo / QuickGO
Orthologs
Species	Human	Mouse
Entrez	23559	22377
Ensembl	ENSG00000239779	ENSMUSG00000030035
UniProt	Q96G27	P97764
RefSeq (mRNA)	NM_012477	NM_001083922; NM_001083923; NM_016757
RefSeq (protein)	NP_036609	NP_001077391; NP_001077392; NP_058037
Location (UCSC)	Chr 2: 74.46 – 74.46 Mb	Chr 6: 83.1 – 83.1 Mb
PubMed search
- Wikidata
View/Edit Human	View/Edit Mouse

WW domain-binding protein 1 is a protein that in humans is encoded by the WBP1 gene.

The globular WW domain is composed of 38 to 40 semiconserved amino acids shared by proteins of diverse functions including structural, regulatory, and signaling proteins. The domain is involved in mediating protein-protein interactions through the binding of polyproline ligands.

This gene encodes a WW domain binding protein, which binds to the WW domain of Yes kinase-associated protein by a conserved region: XPPXY motif. The function of this protein has not been determined.
