= STRIDE (algorithm) =

In protein structure, STRIDE (Structural identification) is an algorithm for the assignment of protein secondary structure elements given the atomic coordinates of the protein, as defined by X-ray crystallography, protein NMR, or another protein structure determination method. In addition to the hydrogen bond criteria used by the more common DSSP algorithm, the STRIDE assignment criteria also include dihedral angle potentials. As such, its criteria for defining individual secondary structures are more complex than those of DSSP. The STRIDE energy function contains a hydrogen-bond term containing a Lennard-Jones-like 8-6 distance-dependent potential and two angular dependence factors reflecting the planarity of the optimized hydrogen bond geometry. The criteria for individual secondary structural elements, which are divided into the same groups as those reported by DSSP, also contain statistical probability factors derived from empirical examinations of solved structures with visually assigned secondary structure elements extracted from the Protein Data Bank.

Although DSSP is the older method and continues to be the most commonly used, the original STRIDE definition reported it to give a more satisfactory structural assignment in at least 70% of cases. In particular, STRIDE was observed to correct for the propensity of DSSP to assign shorter secondary structures than would be assigned by an expert crystallographer, usually due to the minor local variations in structure that are most common near the termini of secondary structure elements. Using a sliding-window method to smooth variations in assignment of single terminal residues, current implementations of STRIDE and DSSP are reported to agree in up to 95.4% of cases. Both STRIDE and DSSP, among other common secondary structure assignment methods, are believed to underpredict pi helices.

== See also ==
- DSSP
