= Leucine zipper =

DNA-binding structural motif

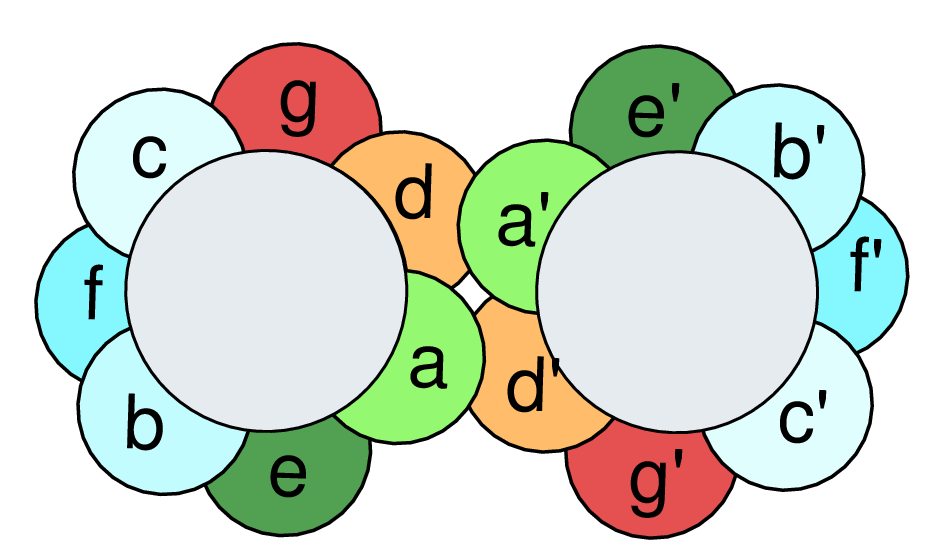
"Overhead view", or helical wheel diagram, of a leucine zipper, where d represents leucine, arranged with other amino acids on two parallel alpha helices.

A leucine zipper (or leucine scissors) is a common three-dimensional structural motif in proteins. It was first described by Landschulz and collaborators in 1988 when they found that an enhancer binding protein had a very characteristic 30-amino acid segment, and the display of these amino acid sequences on an idealized alpha helix revealed a periodic repetition of leucine residues at every seventh position over a distance covering eight helical turns. The polypeptide segments containing these periodic arrays of leucine residues were proposed to exist in an alpha-helical conformation and the leucine side chains from one alpha helix interdigitate with those from the alpha helix of a second polypeptide, facilitating dimerization.

Leucine zippers are a dimerization motif of the bZIP (Basic-region leucine zipper) class of eukaryotic transcription factors. The bZIP domain is 60 to 80 amino acids in length with a highly conserved DNA binding basic region and a more diversified leucine zipper dimerization region.. Leucine zippers are frequently used to cause artificial dimerization in protein engineering. The localization of the leucines are critical for the DNA binding to the proteins. Leucine zippers are present in both eukaryotic and prokaryotic regulatory proteins, but are mainly a feature of eukaryotes. They can also be annotated simply as ZIPs, and ZIP-like motifs have been found in proteins other than transcription factors and are thought to be one of the general protein modules for protein–protein interactions.

== Sequence and structure ==
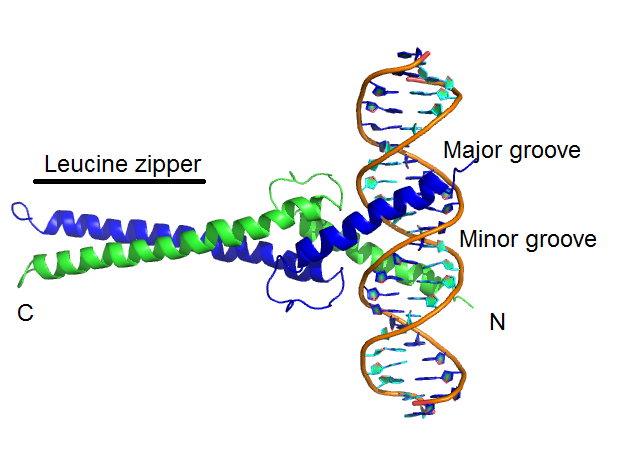
Another DNA binding domain, the Helix-loop-helix (HLH) dimer, is shown bound to DNA fragment — each alpha helix represents a monomer.

Leucine zipper is created by the dimerization of two specific alpha helix monomers bound to DNA. The leucine zipper is formed by amphipathic interaction between two ZIP domains. The ZIP domain is found in the alpha-helix of each monomer, and contains leucines, or leucine-like amino acids. These amino acids are spaced out in each region's polypeptide sequence in such a way that when the sequence is coiled in a 3D alpha-helix, the leucine residues line up on the same side of the helix. This region of the alpha-helix - containing the leucines which line up - is called a ZIP domain, and leucines from each ZIP domain can weakly interact with leucines from other ZIP domains, reversibly holding their alpha-helices together (dimerization). When these alpha helices dimerize, the zipper is formed. The hydrophobic side of the helix forms a dimer with itself or another similar helix, burying the non-polar amino acids away from the solvent. The hydrophilic side of the helix interacts with the water in the solvent.

Leucine zipper motifs are considered a subtype of coiled coils, which are built by two or more alpha helices that are wound around each other to form a supercoil. Coiled coils contain 3- and 4-residue repeats whose hydrophobicity pattern and residue composition is compatible with the structure of amphipathic alpha-helices. The alternating three- and four-residue sequence elements constitute heptad repeats in which the amino acids are designated from a' to g'. While residues in positions a and d are generally hydrophobic and form a zigzag pattern of knobs and holes that interlock with a similar pattern on another strand to form a tight-fitting hydrophobic core, residues in positions e and g are charged residues contributing to the electrostatic interaction.

In the case of leucine zippers, leucines are predominant at the d position of the heptad repeat. These residues pack against each other every second turn of the alpha-helices, and the hydrophobic region between two helices is completed by residues at the a positions, which are also frequently hydrophobic. They are referred to as coiled coils unless they are proven to be important for protein function. If that is the case, then they are annotated in the "domain" subsection, which would be the bZIP domain.

Two different types of such a-helices can pair up to form a heterodimeric leucine zipper. With apolar amino acid residues at either the e or g position, a heterotetramer consisting of 2 different leucine zippers can be generated in-vitro, which implies that the overall hydrophobicity of the interaction surface and van der Waals interaction may alter the organization of coiled coils and play a role in the formation of leucine zipper heterodimer.

== Specific binding between bZIP proteins and DNA ==
The bZIP interacts with the DNA via basic, amine residues (see basic amino acids in (provided table (sort by pH)) of certain amino acids in the "basic" domain, such as lysines and arginines. These basic residues interact in the major groove of the DNA, forming sequence-specific interactions. The mechanism of transcriptional regulation by bZIP proteins has been studied in detail. Most bZIP proteins show high binding affinity for the ACGT motifs, which include CACGTG (G box), GACGTC (C box), TACGTA (A box), AACGTT (T box), and a GCN4 motif, namely TGA(G/C)TCA. The bZIP heterodimers exist in a variety of eukaryotes and are more common in organisms with higher evolution complexity. Heterodimeric bZIP proteins differ from homodimeric bZIP and from each other in protein-protein interaction affinity. These heterodimers exhibit complex DNA binding specificity. When combined with a different partner, most of the bZIP pairs bind to DNA sequences that each individual partner prefers. In some cases, dimerization of different bZIP partners can change the DNA sequence that the pair targets in a manner that could not have been predicted based on the preferences of each partner alone. This suggests that, as heterodimers, bZIP transcription factors are able to change their preferences for which location they target in the DNA. The ability of bZIP domain forming dimers with different partners greatly expands the locations on the genome to which bZIP transcription factors can bind and from which they can regulate gene expression.

A small number of bZIP factors such as OsOBF1 can also recognize palindromic sequences. However, the others, including LIP19, OsZIP-2a, and OsZIP-2b, do not bind to DNA sequences. Instead, these bZIP proteins form heterodimers with other bZIPs to regulate transcriptional activities.

== Biology ==
Leucine zipper regulatory proteins include c-fos and c-jun (the AP1 transcription factor), important regulators of normal development, as well as myc family members including myc, max, and mxd1. If they are overproduced or mutated in a vital area, they may cause cancer.

=== BZIP containing transcription factors regulate various biological processes ===
The bZIP-containing Nuclear factor interleukin 3 regulated protein (NFIL3) is a transcription repressor which play multiple roles in regulating various biological processes. The NFIL3 protein has 462 amino acids including a b-ZIP domain . The N-terminal portion of the domain contains the basic motif, which directly binds to DNA. The C-terminal portion of the b-ZIP domain contains an amphipathic leucine zipper region, which mediates homo- and hetero- dimerization.

The expression of the Nfil3 gene changes along with the circadian cycle and the NFIL3, as a repression factor, regulates circadian rhythm. NFIL3 competes with the transcription activator D site albumin promoter binding protein (DBP) in binding with the D box elements in the DNA, which is one of the circadian transcription factor consensus sites. DBP is another bZIP protein and shows an opposite portfolio of expression level to that of NFIL3. When NFIL3 level is high, genes under control of the D box elements will be repressed. Overexpression of Nfil3 shortens the circadian cycle.

NFIL3 influences cell survival and involves in oncogenesis. NFIL3 is shown to be a survival factor that hinders apoptotic cell death in numerous cell types and leads to oncogenesis. High expression level of NFIL3 is shown associate with breast cancer. In cancer cells, NFIL3 associates with Histone deacetylase2 (HDAC2) and represses pro-apoptotic genes such as Tumor necrosis factor ligand superfamily member 10 (TRAIL) and TNF receptor superfamily member 6 (FAS) to prevent apoptosis. NFIL3 can also hinder apoptosis in cancer cells by binding to DNA and block the access of transcription factor Forkhead box O1 (FOXO1) to cell death genes, which undermines cell cycle and promotes oncogenesis. In colon cancer, NFIL3 may also block the recruitment of another type of transcription factors, Proline Acid Rich (PAR) proteins.

NFIL3 functions as a repressor to neuron regeneration associated genes. Nfil3 is expressed in neuron cells with regeneration potential to keep cell growth under control. Expression of Nfil3 is induced by phosphorylated cAMP-response element binding protein (CREB), and the NFIL3 protein in turn competes for binding sites shared with CREB and CCAAT/Enhancer Binding Protein (CEBP), which downregulates target genes of CREB and CEBP to counteract the effect of cAMP signaling. Meanwhile, NFIL3 binds to its own promoter to repress its own expression, creating a negative feedback regulation of neuron regeneration.

NFIL3 is also found to be important in immunology. It is required for natural killer cells and vital for the development and function of other immune cells, including but not limited to anti-inflammatory response in helper T cells, production of IgE from B cells, maturation of CD8a dendritic cells and priming of CD8+ T cells.
