= Beta bend ribbon =

The beta bend ribbon, or beta-bend ribbon, is a structural feature in polypeptides and proteins. The shortest possible has six amino acid residues (numbered i to i+5) arranged as two overlapping hydrogen bonded beta turns in which the carbonyl group of residue i is hydrogen-bonded to the NH of residue i+3 while the carbonyl group of residue i+2 is hydrogen-bonded to the NH of residue i+5. In longer ribbons, this bonding is continued in peptides of 8, 10, etc., amino acid residues. A beta bend ribbon can be regarded as an aberrant 310 helix (3/10-helix) that has lost some of its hydrogen bonds. Two websites are available to facilitate finding and examining these features in proteins: Motivated Proteins and PDBeMotif.

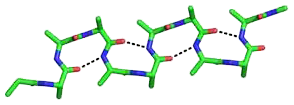
A beta bend ribbon with 12 alanine residues. Colors of atoms: carbon, green; oxygen red; nitrogen blue. The four dashed lines are hydrogen bonds, each of which defines a beta turn.

The four main types of hydrogen-bonded beta turns are types I, I’, II and II’. Beta bend ribbons may be formed from any of these types but type I is the most common in proteins, as it is for single beta turns. Beta bend ribbons made from type I or I’ turns are somewhat twisted, while beta bend ribbons made from type II or II’ beta turns are flat. Beta bend ribbons with mixtures of different beta turn types also occur.

Type I beta-bend ribbons regularly occur in leucine-rich repeats, in the environments sometimes occupied by helices. A protein with a stack of these features is the extracellular ligand-binding domain of the Nogo receptor. Another beta bend ribbon occurs in the GTPase-activating protein for Rho in the active, but not the inactive, form of the enzyme. The beta bend ribbon, which incorporates the catalytic arginine, allows its side-chain guanidino group to approach the active site and enhance enzyme activity.

Polypeptides consisting of repeats of the dipeptide (α-amino-γ-lactam plus a conventional amino acid) have been shown to adopt a beta bend ribbon conformation.
