= Protein secondary structure =

General three-dimensional form of local segments of proteins

The image above contains clickable links This diagram (which is interactive) of protein structure uses PCNA as an example. (PDB: 1AXC)

Protein secondary structure is the local three-dimensional spatial conformation of the polypeptide backbone excluding the side chains. The two most common secondary structural elements are alpha helices and beta sheets, though beta turns and omega loops occur as well. Secondary structure elements typically spontaneously form as an intermediate before the protein folds into its three dimensional tertiary structure.

Secondary structure is formally defined by the pattern of hydrogen bonds between the amino hydrogen and carboxyl oxygen atoms in the peptide backbone. Secondary structure may alternatively be defined based on the regular pattern of backbone dihedral angles in a particular region of the Ramachandran plot regardless of whether it has the correct hydrogen bonds.

The concept of secondary structure was introduced by Kaj Ulrik Linderstrøm-Lang at Stanford in 1952. Other types of biopolymers such as nucleic acids also possess characteristic secondary structures.

== Types ==
Structural features of the three major forms of protein helices
Geometry attribute	α-helix	3_{10} helix	π-helix
Residues per turn	3.6	3.0	4.4
Translation per residue	1.5 Å (0.15 nm)	2.0 Å (0.20 nm)	1.1 Å (0.11 nm)
Radius of helix	2.3 Å (0.23 nm)	1.9 Å (0.19 nm)	2.8 Å (0.28 nm)
Pitch	5.4 Å (0.54 nm)	6.0 Å (0.60 nm)	4.8 Å (0.48 nm)

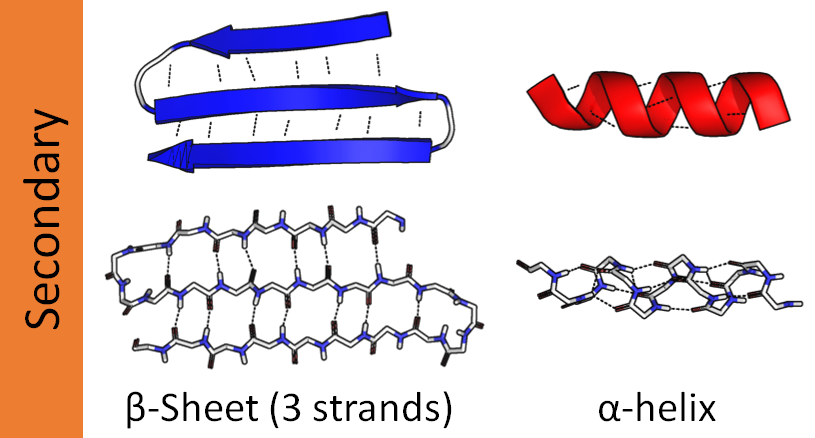
The image above contains clickable links Interactive diagram of hydrogen bonds in protein secondary structure. Cartoon above, atoms below with nitrogen in blue, oxygen in red (PDB: 1AXC)

The most common secondary structures are alpha helices and beta sheets. Other helices, such as the 3_{10} helix and π helix, are calculated to have energetically favorable hydrogen-bonding patterns but are rarely observed in natural proteins except at the ends of α helices due to unfavorable backbone packing in the center of the helix. Other extended structures such as the polyproline helix and alpha sheet are rare in native state proteins but are often hypothesized as important protein folding intermediates. Tight turns and loose, flexible loops link the more "regular" secondary structure elements. The random coil is not a true secondary structure, but is the class of conformations that indicate an absence of regular secondary structure.

Amino acids vary in their ability to form the various secondary structure elements. Helical conformation in proteins is preferred methionine, alanine, leucine, glutamate and lysine ("MALEK" in amino-acid 1-letter codes) as well as arginine (R) and glutamine (Q); by contrast, the large aromatic residues (tryptophan, tyrosine and phenylalanine) and C^{β}-branched amino acids (isoleucine, valine, and threonine) prefer to adopt β-strand conformations. Turns and bends are preferred by glycine (G), asparagine (N), proline (P), aspartate (D) and serine (S), whereas the last two amino acids, cysteine (C) and histidine (H) show no preference. Besides this, proline and glycine are sometimes known as "helix breakers" because they disrupt the regularity of the α helical backbone conformation; However, these preferences are not strong enough to produce a reliable method of predicting secondary structure from sequence alone.

Low frequency collective vibrations are thought to be sensitive to local rigidity within proteins, revealing beta structures to be generically more rigid than alpha or disordered proteins. Neutron scattering measurements have directly connected the spectral feature at ~1 THz to collective motions of the secondary structure of beta-barrel protein GFP.

Hydrogen bonding patterns in secondary structures may be significantly distorted, which makes automatic determination of secondary structure difficult. There are several methods for formally defining protein secondary structure (e.g., DSSP, DEFINE, STRIDE, ScrewFit, SST).

=== DSSP classification ===
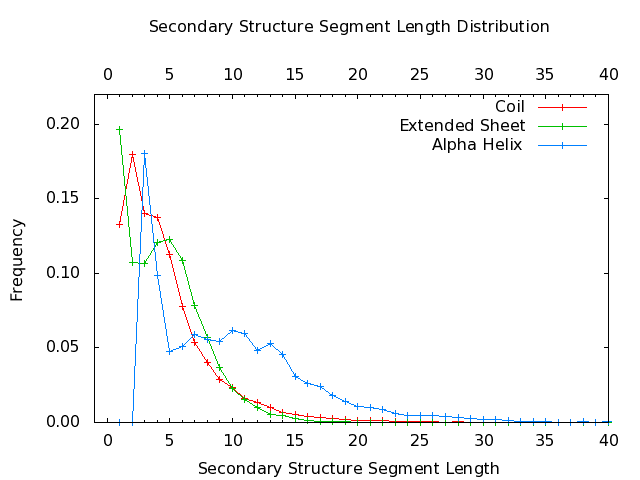
Distribution obtained from non-redundant pdb_select dataset (March 2006); Secondary structure assigned by DSSP; 8 conformational states reduced to 3 states: H=HGI, E=EB, C=STC. Visible are mixtures of (gaussian) distributions, resulting also from the reduction of DSSP states.

The Dictionary of Protein Secondary Structure, in short DSSP, is commonly used to describe the protein secondary structure with single letter codes. The secondary structure is assigned based on hydrogen bonding patterns as those initially proposed by Pauling et al. in 1951 (before any protein structure had ever been experimentally determined). DSSP assigns secondary structure from three-dimensional atomic coordinates using hydrogen-bonding patterns and features of backbone geometry. There are eight types of secondary structure that DSSP defines:

- G = 3-turn helix (3_{10} helix). Min length 3 residues.
- H = 4-turn helix (α helix). Minimum length 4 residues.
- I = 5-turn helix (π helix). Minimum length 5 residues.
- T = hydrogen bonded turn (3, 4 or 5 turn)
- E = extended strand in parallel and/or anti-parallel β-sheet conformation. Min length 2 residues.
- B = residue in isolated β-bridge (single pair β-sheet hydrogen bond formation)
- S = bend (the only non-hydrogen-bond based assignment).
- C = coil (residues which are not in any of the above conformations).

'Coil' is often codified as ' ' (space), C (coil) or '–' (dash). The helices (G, H and I) and sheet conformations are all required to have a reasonable length. This means that 2 adjacent residues in the primary structure must form the same hydrogen bonding pattern. If the helix or sheet hydrogen bonding pattern is too short they are designated as T or B, respectively. Other protein secondary structure assignment categories exist (sharp turns, Omega loops, etc.), but they are less frequently used.

Secondary structure is defined by hydrogen bonding, so the exact definition of a hydrogen bond is critical. The standard hydrogen-bond definition for secondary structure is that of DSSP, which is a purely electrostatic model. It assigns charges of ±q_{1} ≈ 0.42e to the carbonyl carbon and oxygen, respectively, and charges of ±q_{2} ≈ 0.20e to the amide hydrogen and nitrogen, respectively. The electrostatic energy is

$$E = q_{1} q_{2}
\left( \frac{1}{r_\mathrm{ON}} + \frac{1}{r_\mathrm{CH}} - \frac{1}{r_\mathrm{OH}} - \frac{1}{r_\mathrm{CN}} \right) \cdot 332 \text{ kcal/mol}.$$

According to DSSP, a hydrogen-bond exists if and only if E is less than −0.5 kcal/mol (−2.1 kJ/mol). Although the DSSP formula is a relatively crude approximation of the physical hydrogen-bond energy, it is generally accepted as a tool for defining secondary structure.

=== SST classification ===
SST is a Bayesian method to assign secondary structure to protein coordinate data using the Shannon information criterion of Minimum Message Length (MML) inference. SST treats any assignment of secondary structure as a potential hypothesis that attempts to explain (compress) given protein coordinate data. The core idea is that the best secondary structural assignment is the one that can explain (compress) the coordinates of a given protein coordinates in the most economical way, thus linking the inference of secondary structure to lossless data compression. SST accurately delineates any protein chain into regions associated with the following assignment types:

- E = (Extended) strand of a β-pleated sheet
- G = Right-handed 3_{10} helix
- H = Right-handed α-helix
- I = Right-handed π-helix
- g = Left-handed 3_{10} helix
- h = Left-handed α-helix
- i = Left-handed π-helix
- 3 = 3_{10}-like Turn
- 4 = α-like Turn
- 5 = π-like Turn
- T = Unspecified Turn
- C = Coil
- - = Unassigned residue

SST detects π and 3_{10} helical caps to standard α-helices, and automatically assembles the various extended strands into consistent β-pleated sheets. It provides a readable output of dissected secondary structural elements, and a corresponding PyMol-loadable script to visualize the assigned secondary structural elements individually.

== Experimental determination ==
The rough secondary-structure content of a biopolymer (e.g., "this protein is 40% α-helix and 20% β-sheet") can be estimated spectroscopically. For proteins, a common method is far-ultraviolet (far-UV, 170–250 nm) circular dichroism. A pronounced double minimum at 208 and 222 nm indicate α-helical structure, whereas a single minimum at 204 nm or 217 nm reflects random-coil or β-sheet structure, respectively. A less common method is infrared spectroscopy, which detects differences in the bond oscillations of amide groups due to hydrogen-bonding. Finally, secondary-structure contents may be estimated accurately using the chemical shifts of an initially unassigned NMR spectrum.

== Prediction ==
Predicting protein tertiary structure from only its amino sequence is a very challenging problem (see protein structure prediction), but using the simpler secondary structure definitions is more tractable.

Early methods of secondary-structure prediction were restricted to predicting the three predominate states: helix, sheet, or random coil. These methods were based on the helix- or sheet-forming propensities of individual amino acids, sometimes coupled with rules for estimating the free energy of forming secondary structure elements. The first widely used techniques to predict protein secondary structure from the amino acid sequence were the Chou–Fasman method and the GOR method. Although such methods claimed to achieve ~60% accurate in predicting which of the three states (helix/sheet/coil) a residue adopts, blind computing assessments later showed that the actual accuracy was much lower.

A significant increase in accuracy (to nearly ~80%) was made by exploiting multiple sequence alignment; knowing the full distribution of amino acids that occur at a position (and in its vicinity, typically ~7 residues on either side) throughout evolution provides a much better picture of the structural tendencies near that position. For illustration, a given protein might have a glycine at a given position, which by itself might suggest a random coil there. However, multiple sequence alignment might reveal that helix-favoring amino acids occur at that position (and nearby positions) in 95% of homologous proteins spanning nearly a billion years of evolution. Moreover, by examining the average hydrophobicity at that and nearby positions, the same alignment might also suggest a pattern of residue solvent accessibility consistent with an α-helix. Taken together, these factors would suggest that the glycine of the original protein adopts α-helical structure, rather than random coil. Several types of methods are used to combine all the available data to form a 3-state prediction, including neural networks, hidden Markov models and support vector machines. Modern prediction methods also provide a confidence score for their predictions at every position.

Secondary-structure prediction methods were evaluated by the Critical Assessment of protein Structure Prediction (CASP) experiments and continuously benchmarked, e.g. by EVA (benchmark). Based on these tests, the most accurate methods were Psipred, SAM, PORTER, PROF, and SABLE. The chief area for improvement appears to be the prediction of β-strands; residues confidently predicted as β-strand are likely to be so, but the methods are apt to overlook some β-strand segments (false negatives). There is likely an upper limit of ~90% prediction accuracy overall, due to the idiosyncrasies of the standard method (DSSP) for assigning secondary-structure classes (helix/strand/coil) to PDB structures, against which the predictions are benchmarked.

Accurate secondary-structure prediction is a key element in the prediction of tertiary structure, in all but the simplest (homology modeling) cases. For example, a confidently predicted pattern of six secondary structure elements βαββαβ is the signature of a ferredoxin fold.

== Applications ==
Both protein and nucleic acid secondary structures can be used to aid in multiple sequence alignment. These alignments can be made more accurate by the inclusion of secondary structure information in addition to simple sequence information. This is sometimes less useful in RNA because base pairing is much more highly conserved than sequence. Distant relationships between proteins whose primary structures are unalignable can sometimes be found by secondary structure. Both SCOP/SCOPe and CATH classify protein folds using the three-dimensional arrangement and connectivity of their major secondary-structure elements. Secondary-structure states can serve as evolutionary characters in probabilistic structural phylogenetic inference, particularly when primary-sequence divergence limits conventional sequence-based analyses; such models have been applied to infer phylogenies among structurally related TIR-domain proteins.

It has been shown that α-helices are more stable, robust to mutations, and designable than β-strands in natural proteins, thus designing functional all-α proteins is likely to be easier that designing proteins with both helices and strands; this has been recently confirmed experimentally.

== See also ==
- Protein folding
- Folding (chemistry)
- Nucleic acid secondary structure
- Translation
- Structural motif
- Protein circular dichroism data bank
- WHAT IF software
- List of protein secondary structure prediction programs
