= Turn (biochemistry) =

A turn is an element of secondary structure in proteins where the polypeptide chain reverses its overall direction.

== Definition ==
According to one definition, a turn is a structural motif where the C^{α} atoms of two residues separated by a few (usually 1 to 5) peptide bonds are close (less than 7 Å [0.70 nm]). The proximity of the terminal C^{α} atoms often correlates with formation of an inter main chain hydrogen bond between the corresponding residues. Such hydrogen bonding is the basis for the original, perhaps better known, turn definition. In many cases, but not all, the hydrogen-bonding and C^{α}-distance definitions are equivalent.

== Types of turns ==
Scheme of beta turns (type I and type II)

Turns are classified according to the separation between the two end residues:

- In an α-turn the end residues are separated by four peptide bonds (i → i ± 4).
- In a β-turn (the most common form), by three bonds (i → i ± 3).
- In a γ-turn, by two bonds (i → i ± 2).
- In a δ-turn, by one bond (i → i ± 1), which is sterically unlikely.
- In a π-turn, by five bonds (i → i ± 5).

Ideal angles for different β-turn types. Types VIa1, VIa2 and VIb turns are subject to the additional condition that residue i + 2(*) must be a cis-proline.
Type	φ_{i + 1}	ψ_{i + 1}	φ_{i + 2}	ψ_{i + 2}
I	−60°	−30°	−90°	0°
II	−60°	120°	80°	0°
VIII	−60°	−30°	−120°	120°
I′	60°	30°	90°	0°
II′	60°	−120°	−80°	0°
VIa1	−60°	120°	−90°	0°*
VIa2	−120°	120°	−60°	0°*
VIb	−135°	135°	−75°	160°*
IV	turns excluded from all the above categories			

Turns are classified by their backbone dihedral angles (see Ramachandran plot). A turn can be converted into its inverse turn (in which the main chain atoms have opposite chirality) by changing the sign on its dihedral angles. (The inverse turn is not a true enantiomer since the C^{α} atom chirality is maintained.) Thus, the γ-turn has two forms, a classical form with (φ, ψ) dihedral angles of roughly (75°, −65°) and an inverse form with dihedral angles (−75°, 65°). At least eight forms of the beta turn occur, varying in whether a cis isomer of a peptide bond is involved and on the dihedral angles of the central two residues. The classical and inverse β-turns are distinguished with a prime, e.g., type I and type I′ beta turns. If an i → i + 3 hydrogen bond is taken as the criterion for turns, the four categories of Venkatachalam (I, II, II′, I′) suffice to describe all possible beta turns. All four occur frequently in proteins but I is most common, followed by II, I′ and II′ in that order.

=== Loops ===
An ω-loop is a catch-all term for a longer, extended or irregular loop without fixed internal hydrogen bonding.

=== Multiple turns ===
In many cases, one or more residues are involved in two partially overlapping turns. For example, in a sequence of 5 residues, both residues 1 to 4 and residues 2 to 5 form a turn; in such a case, one speaks of an (i, i + 1) double turn. Multiple turns (up to sevenfold) occur commonly in proteins. Beta bend ribbons are a different type of multiple turn.

Multiple types of short H-bonded loop motifs are composed of overlapping H-bonded turns of the same or different types (lengths), including the Schellman loop and its variants, the multiple types of the beta bulge loop, and others. These motifs, which play key roles in proteins, including as helix caps, chain-reversers in beta hairpins and ligand binders, have been described as "compound turns" and classified using a compact notation that specifies the types and start positions in the loop of each motif's turns. The ExploreTurns tool supports the exploration and analysis of these motifs. The tool may also be used to explore individual H-bonded turns of all types.

=== Hairpins ===
A hairpin is a special case of a turn, in which the direction of the protein backbone reverses and the flanking secondary structure elements interact. For example, a beta hairpin connects two hydrogen-bonded, antiparallel β-strands (a rather confusing name, since a β-hairpin may contain many types of turns – α, β, γ, etc.).

Beta hairpins may be classified according to the number of residues that make up the turn - that is, that are not part of the flanking β-strands. If this number is X or Y (according to two different definitions of β sheets) the β hairpin is defined as X:Y.

Beta turns at the loop ends of beta hairpins have a different distribution of types from the others; type I′ is commonest, followed by types II′, I and II.

=== Flexible linkers ===
Turns are sometimes found within flexible linkers or loops connecting protein domains. Linker sequences vary in length and are typically rich in polar uncharged amino acids. Flexible linkers allow connecting domains to freely twist and rotate to recruit their binding partners via protein domain dynamics. They also allow their binding partners to induce larger scale conformational changes by long-range allostery.

== Role in protein folding ==
Two hypotheses have been proposed for the role of turns in protein folding. In one view, turns play a critical role in folding by bringing together and enabling or allowing interactions between regular secondary structure elements. This view is supported by mutagenesis studies indicating a critical role for particular residues in the turns of some proteins. Also, nonnative isomers of X−Pro peptide bonds in turns can completely block the conformational folding of some proteins. In the opposing view, turns play a passive role in folding. This view is supported by the poor amino-acid conservation observed in most turns. The non-native isomers of many X−Pro peptide bonds in turns also have little or no effect on folding.

== Beta turn prediction methods ==
Over the years, many beta turn prediction methods have been developed. Recently, Dr. Raghava's Group developed BetaTPred3 method which predicts a complete beta turn rather than individual residues falling into a beta turn. The method also achieves good accuracy and is the first method which predicts all 9 types of beta turns. Apart from prediction, this method can also be used to find the minimum number of mutations required to initiate or break a beta turn in a protein at a desired location.

== See also ==
- Secondary structure
- beta turns

== Literature ==
These references are ordered by date.

- Venkatachalam CM. (1968). "Stereochemical criteria for polypeptides and proteins. V. Conformation of a system of three linked peptide units". Biopolymers. 6 (10): 1425–36. doi:10.1002/bip.1968.360061006. hdl:2027.42/37819. PMID 5685102.
- Némethy, George; Printz, Morton P. (1972). "The $\gamma$-Turn, a Possible Folded Conformation of the Polypeptide Chain. Comparison with the β-Turn". Macromolecules. 5 (6): 755–758. doi:10.1021/ma60030a017.
- Lewis PN, Momany FA, Scheraga HA (1973). "Chain reversals in proteins". Biochim Biophys Acta. 303 (2): 211–29. doi:10.1016/0005-2795(73)90350-4. PMID 4351002.
- Toniolo C.; Benedetti, Ettore (1980). "Intramolecularly hydrogen-bonded peptide conformations". CRC Crit Rev Biochem. 9 (1): 1–44. doi:10.3109/10409238009105471. PMID 6254725.
- Richardson JS. (1981). "The anatomy and taxonomy of protein structure". Advances in Protein Chemistry. 34: 167–339. doi:10.1016/S0065-3233(08)60520-3. ISBN 978-0-12-034234-1. PMID 7020376. Archived from the original on 2019-02-10.
- Rose GD, Gierasch LM, Smith JA (1985). "Turns in peptides and proteins". Advances in Protein Chemistry. 37: 1–109. doi:10.1016/S0065-3233(08)60063-7. ISBN 978-0-12-034237-2. PMID 2865874.
- Milner-White EJ, Poet R (1987). "Loops, bulges, turns and hairpins in proteins". Trends Biochem Sci. 12: 189–192. doi:10.1016/0968-0004(87)90091-0.
- Wilmot CM, Thornton JM (1988). "Analysis and prediction of the different types of beta-turn in proteins". J Mol Biol. 203 (1): 221–32. doi:10.1016/0022-2836(88)90103-9. PMID 3184187.
- Sibanda, B.L.; Blundell, T.L.; Thornton, J.M. (1989). "Conformation of β-hairpins in protein structures:: A systematic classification with applications to modelling by homology, electron density fitting and protein engineering". Journal of Molecular Biology. 206 (4): 759–777. doi:10.1016/0022-2836(89)90583-4. PMID 2500530.
- Milner-White, E (1990). "Situations of gamma-turns in proteinsTheir relation to alpha-helices, beta-sheets and ligand binding sites". J. Mol. Biol. 216 (2): 385–397. doi:10.1016/S0022-2836(05)80329-8. PMID 2254936.
- Hutchinson, E.G.; Thornton, J.M. (1994). "A revised set of potentials for β-turn formation in proteins". Protein Science. 3 (12): 2207–2216. doi:10.1002/pro.5560031206. PMC 2142776. PMID 7756980.
- Pavone V, Gaeta G, Lombardi A, Nastri F, Maglio O, Isernia C, Saviano M (1996). "Discovering protein secondary structures: classification and description of isolated alpha-turns". Biopolymers. 38 (6): 705–21. doi:10.1002/(SICI)1097-0282(199606)38:6<705::AID-BIP3>3.0.CO;2-V. PMID 8652792.
- Rajashankar KR, Ramakumar S (1996). "Pi-turns in proteins and peptides: Classification, conformation, occurrence, hydration and sequence". Protein Sci. 5 (5): 932–46. doi:10.1002/pro.5560050515. PMC 2143406. PMID 8732765.
- Shapovalov, M; Vucetic, S; Dunbrack RL, Jr (March 2019). "A new clustering and nomenclature for beta turns derived from high-resolution protein structures". PLOS Computational Biology. 15 (3) e1006844. Bibcode:2019PLSCB..15E6844S. doi:10.1371/journal.pcbi.1006844. PMC 6424458. PMID 30845191.
