= Pi helix =

Secondary protein structure

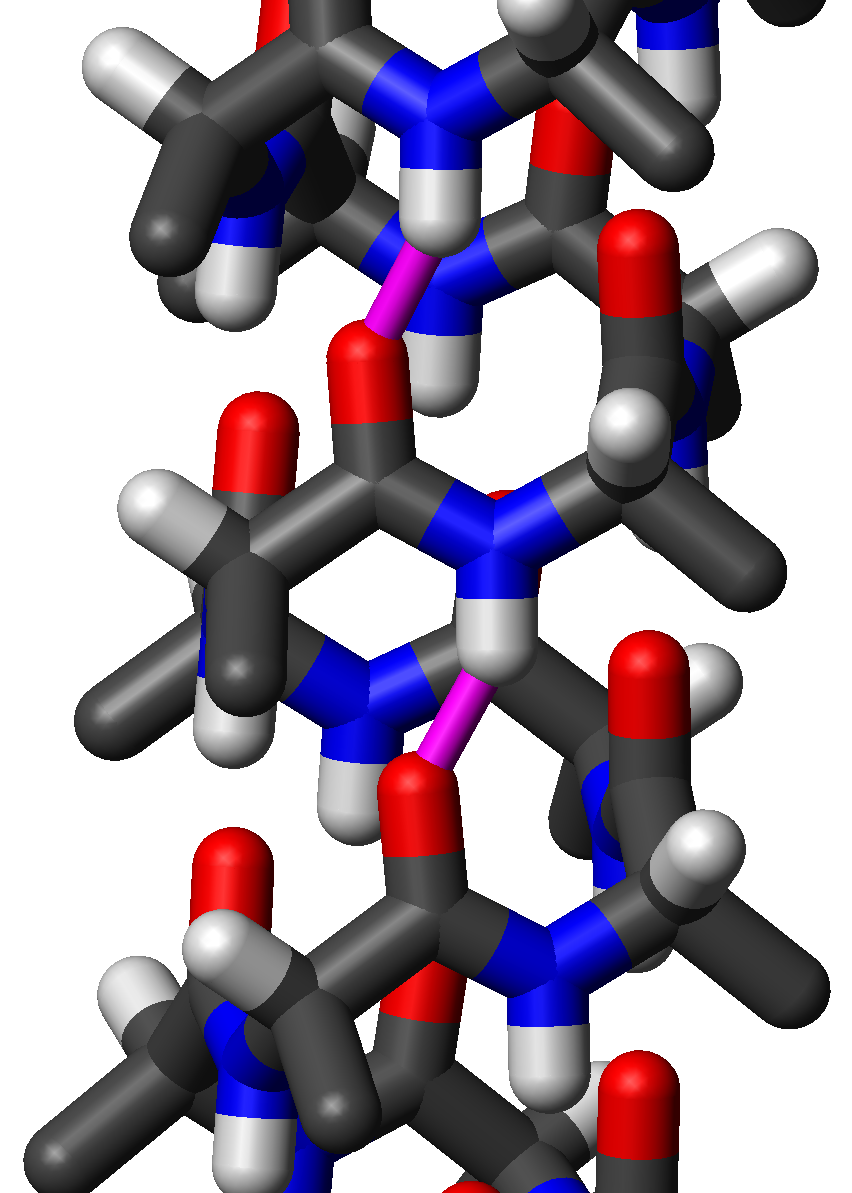
Side view of a standard π-helix of L-alanine residues in atomic detail. Two hydrogen bonds to the same peptide group are highlighted in magenta; the oxygen-hydrogen distance is 1.65 Å (165 pm). The protein chain runs upwards, i.e., its N-terminus is at the bottom and its C-terminus at the top of the figure. Note that the sidechains point slightly downwards, i.e., towards the N-terminus.

A pi helix (or π-helix) is a type of secondary structure found in proteins. Discovered by crystallographer Barbara Low in 1952 and once thought to be rare, short π-helices are found in 15% of known protein structures and are believed to be an evolutionary adaptation derived by the insertion of a single amino acid into an α-helix. Because such insertions are highly destabilizing, the formation of π-helices would tend to be selected against unless it provided some functional advantage to the protein. π-helices therefore are typically found near functional sites of proteins.

== Standard structure ==
The amino acids in a standard π-helix are arranged in a right-handed helical structure. Each amino acid corresponds to an 87° turn in the helix (i.e., the helix has 4.1 residues per turn), and a translation of 1.15 Å (0.115 nm) along the helical axis. Most importantly, the N-H group of an amino acid forms a hydrogen bond with the C=O group of the amino acid five residues earlier; this repeated i + 5 → i hydrogen bonding defines a π-helix. Similar structures include the 3_{10} helix (i + 3 → i hydrogen bonding) and the α-helix (i + 4 → i hydrogen bonding).

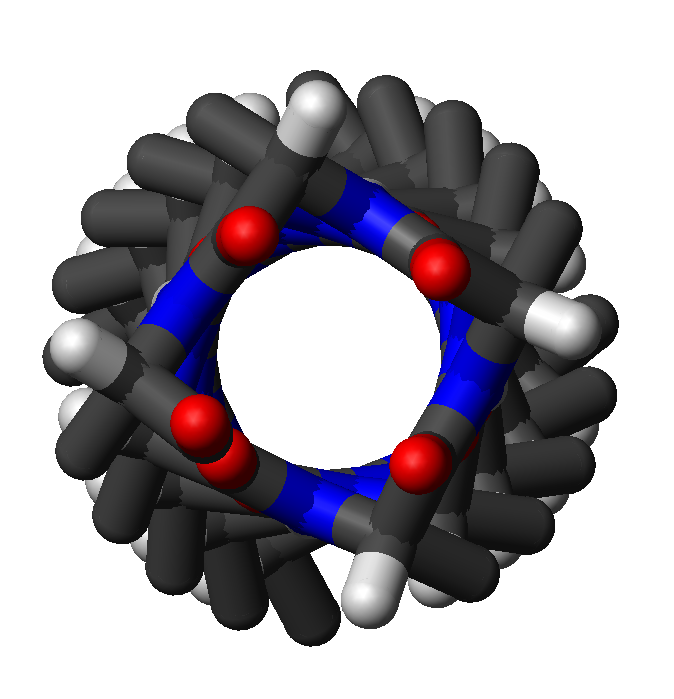
Top view of the same helix shown above. Four carbonyl groups are pointing upwards towards the viewer, spaced roughly 87° apart on the circle, corresponding to 4.1 amino-acid residues per turn of the helix.

The majority of π-helices are only 7 residues in length and do adopt regularly repeating (φ, ψ) dihedral angles throughout the entire structure like that of α-helices or β-sheets. Because of this, textbooks that provide single dihedral values for all residues in the π-helix are misleading. Some generalizations can be made, however. When the first and last residue pairs are excluded, dihedral angles exist such that the ψ dihedral angle of one residue and the φ dihedral angle of the next residue sum to roughly −125°. The first and last residue pairs sum to −95° and −105°, respectively. For comparison, the sum of the dihedral angles for a 3_{10} helix is roughly −75°, whereas that for the α-helix is roughly −105°. Proline is often seen immediately following the end of π-helices. The general formula for the rotation angle Ω per residue of any polypeptide helix with trans isomers is given by the equation

$$3 \cos \Omega = 1 - 4 \cos^{2} \left( \frac{\phi + \psi}{2} \right).$$

== Left-handed structure ==
In principle, a left-handed version of the π-helix is possible by reversing the sign of the (φ, ψ) dihedral angles to (55°, 70°). This pseudo-"mirror-image" helix has roughly the same number of residues per turn (4.1) and helical pitch (1.5 Å [150 pm]). It is not a true mirror image, because the amino-acid residues still have a left-handed chirality. A long left-handed π-helix is unlikely to be observed in proteins because, among the naturally occurring amino acids, only glycine is likely to adopt positive φ dihedral angles such as 55°.

== π-helices in nature ==
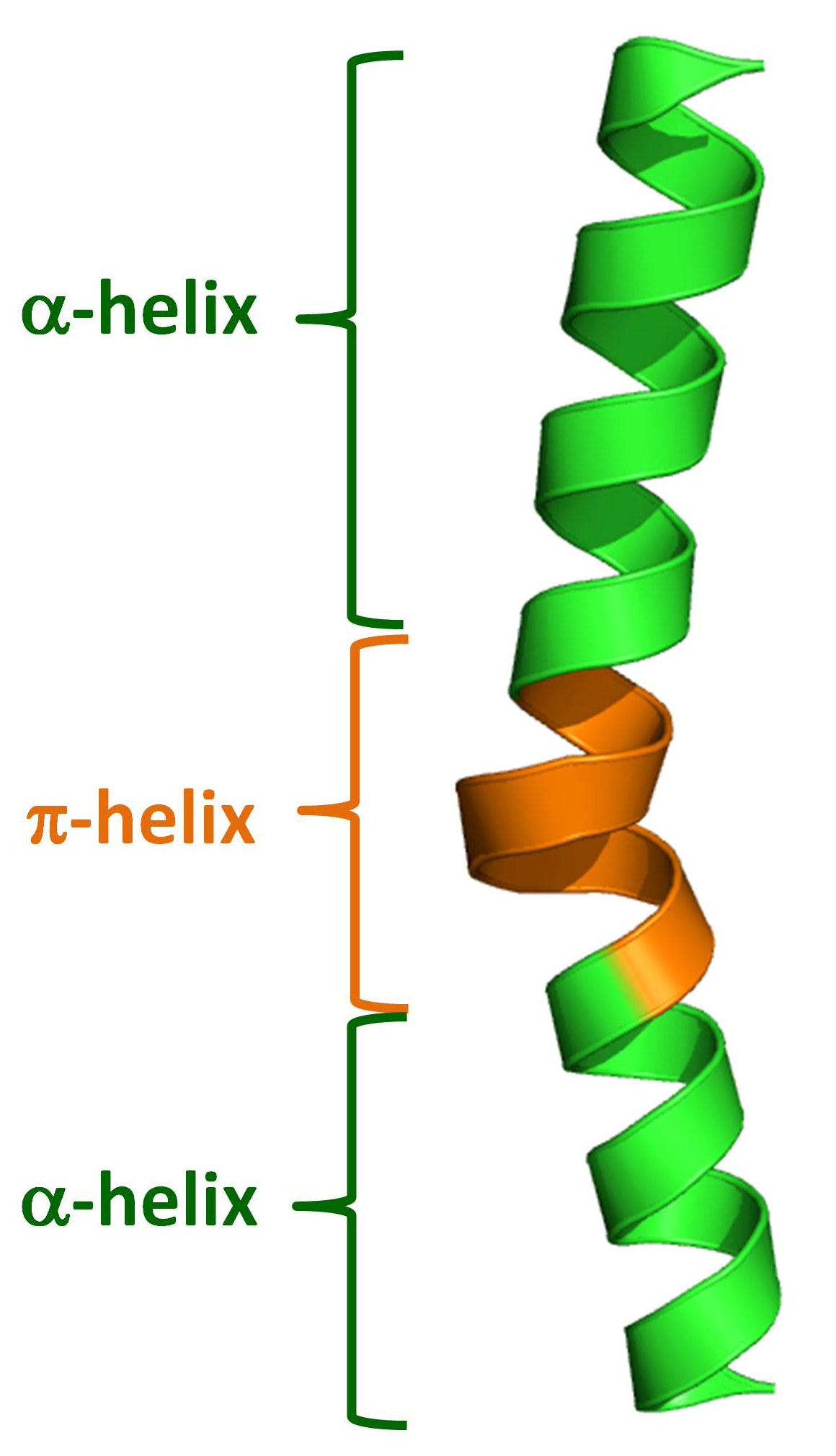
A short, 7 residue π-helix (orange) is embedded within a longer, α-helix (green). The "bulge" of the π-helix can be clearly seen, and was created as the result of a single amino acid that has been inserted into an α-helix. PDB code 3QHB.

Commonly used automated secondary structure assignment programs, such as DSSP, suggest <1% of proteins contain a π-helix. This mis-characterization results from the fact that naturally occurring π-helices are typically short in length (7 to 10 residues) and are almost always associated with (i.e. flanked by) α-helices on either end. Nearly all π-helices are therefore cryptic in that the π-helical residues are incorrectly assigned as either α-helical or as "turns". Recently developed programs have been written to properly annotate π-helices in protein structures and they have found that 1 in 6 proteins (around 15%) do in fact contain at least one π-helical segment.

Natural π-helices can easily be identified in a structure as a "bulge" within a longer α-helix. Such helical bulges have previously been referred to as α-aneurisms, α-bulges, π-bulges, wide-turns, looping outs and π-turns, but in fact are π-helices as determined by their repeating i + 5 → i hydrogen bonds. Evidence suggests that these bulges, or π-helices, are created by the insertion of a single additional amino acid into a pre-existing α-helix. Thus, α-helices and π-helices can be inter-converted by the insertion and deletion of a single amino acid. Given both the relatively high rate of occurrence of π-helices and their noted association with functional sites (i.e. active sites) of proteins, this ability to interconvert between α-helices and π-helices has been an important mechanism of altering and diversifying protein functionality over the course of evolution.

One of the most notable group of proteins whose functional diversification appears to have been heavily influenced by such an evolutionary mechanism is the ferritin-like superfamily, which includes ferritins, bacterioferritins, rubrerythrins, class I ribonucleotide reductases and soluble methane monooxygenases. Soluble methane monooxygenase is the current record holder for the most number of π-helices in a single enzyme with 13 (PDB code 1MTY). However, the bacterial homologue of a Na^{+}/Cl^{−} dependent neurotransmitter transporter (PDB code 2A65) holds the record for the most π-helices in a single peptide chain with 8.

== See also ==
- alpha helix
- 3_{10} helix
- secondary structure
