= 310 helix =

Type of secondary structure

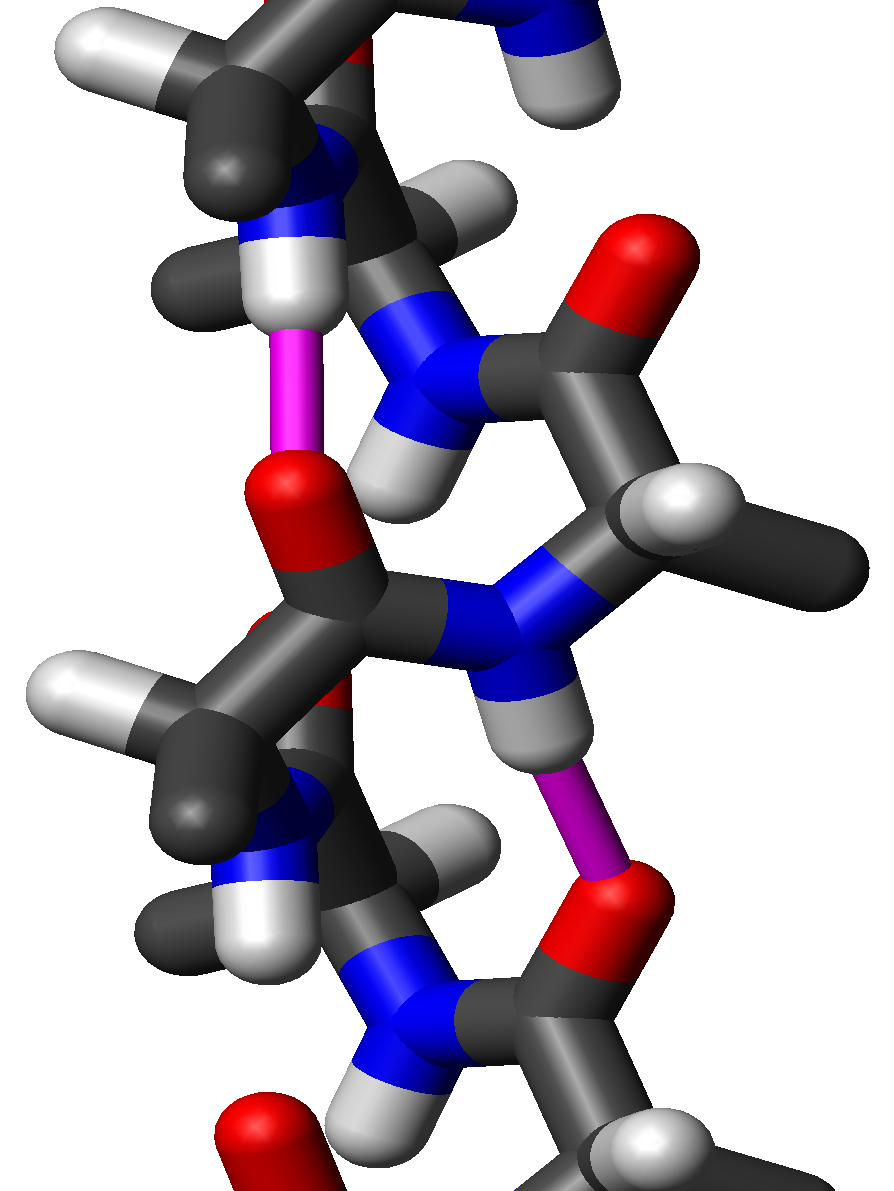
Side view of a 3_{10}-helix of alanine residues in atomic detail. Two hydrogen bonds to the same peptide group are highlighted in magenta; the oxygen-hydrogen distance is 1.83 Å (183 pm). The protein chain runs upwards, i.e., its N-terminus is at the bottom and its C-terminus at the top of the figure. Note that the sidechains point slightly downwards, i.e., towards the N-terminus.

A 3_{10} helix is a type of secondary structure found in proteins and polypeptides. Of the numerous protein secondary structures present, the 3_{10}-helix is the fourth most common type observed; following α-helices, β-sheets and reverse turns. 3_{10}-helices constitute nearly 10–15% of all helices in protein secondary structures, and are typically observed as extensions of α-helices found at either their N- or C- termini. Because of the α-helices tendency to consistently fold and unfold, it has been proposed that the 3_{10}-helix serves as an intermediary conformation of sorts, and provides insight into the initiation of α-helix folding.

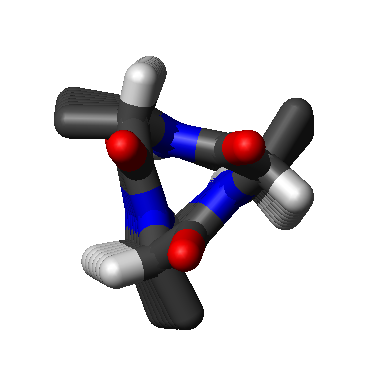
Top view of the same helix shown to the right. Three carbonyl groups are pointing upwards towards the viewer, spaced roughly 120° apart on the circle, corresponding to 3.0 amino-acid residues per turn of the helix.

== Discovery ==
Max Perutz, the head of the Medical Research Council Laboratory of Molecular Biology at the University of Cambridge, wrote the first paper documenting the elusive 3_{10}-helix. Together with Lawrence Bragg and John Kendrew, Perutz published an exploration of polypeptide chain configurations in 1950, based on cues from noncrystalline diffraction data as well as from small molecule crystal structures such as crystalline found in hair. Their proposals included what is now known as the 3_{10} helix, but did not include the two most common structural motifs now known to occur. The following year, Linus Pauling predicted both of those motifs, the alpha helix and the beta sheet, in work which is now compared in significance to Francis Crick and James D. Watson's publication of the DNA double helix. Pauling was highly critical of the helical structures proposed by Bragg, Kendrew, and Perutz, taking a triumphal tone in declaring them all implausible. Perutz describes in his book I wish I'd made you angry sooner the experience of reading Pauling's paper one Saturday morning:

I was thunderstruck by Pauling and Corey's paper. In contrast to Kendrew's and my helices, theirs was free of strain; all of the amide groups were planar and every carbonyl group formed a perfect hydrogen bond with an amino group four residues further along the chain. The structure looked dead right. How could I have missed it?

— Max Perutz, 1998, pp.173-175.

Later that day, an idea for an experiment to confirm Pauling's model occurred to Perutz, and he rushed to the lab to carry it out. Within a few hours, he had the evidence to confirm the alpha helix, which he showed to Bragg first thing on Monday. Perutz' confirmation of the alpha helix structure was published in Nature shortly afterwards. The principles applied in the 1950 paper to theoretical polypeptide structures, true of the 3_{10} helix, included:

- The chains are held together by hydrogen bonding between the hydrogen and oxygen atoms of different by nearby amide (peptide) links formed as the amino acids condense to form the polypeptide chain. These form helical arrangements that cannot be uncoiled without breaking the hydrogen bonds.
- Those structures in which all available NH and CO groups are hydrogen bonded are inherently more probable, because their free energy is presumably lower.

The 3_{10} helix was eventually confirmed by Kendrew in his 1958 structure of myoglobin, and was also found in Perutz' 1960 determination of the structure of haemoglobin and in subsequent work on both its deoxygenated and oxygenated forms.

The 3_{10} helix is now known to be the third principal structure to occur in globular proteins, after the α-helix and β-sheet. They are almost always short sections, with nearly 96% containing four or fewer amino acid residues, appearing in places such as the "corners" where α-helices change direction in the myoglobin structure, for example. Longer sections, in the range of seven to eleven residues, have been observed in the voltage sensor segment of voltage-gated potassium channels in the transmembrane domain of certain helical proteins.

== Structure ==
The amino acids in a 3_{10}-helix are arranged in a right-handed helical structure. Each amino acid corresponds to a 120° turn in the helix (i.e., the helix has three residues per turn), and a translation of 2.0 Å (0.20 nm) along the helical axis, and has 10 atoms in the ring formed by making the hydrogen bond. Most importantly, the N-H group of an amino acid forms a hydrogen bond with the C=O group of the amino acid three residues earlier; this repeated i + 3 → i hydrogen bonding defines a 3_{10}-helix. Similar structures include the α-helix (i + 4 → i hydrogen bonding) and the π-helix i + 5 → i hydrogen bonding.

Residues in long 3_{10}-helices adopt (φ, ψ) dihedral angles near (−49°, −26°). Many 3_{10}-helices in proteins are short, so deviate from these values. More generally, residues in long 3_{10}-helices adopt dihedral angles such that the ψ dihedral angle of one residue and the φ dihedral angle of the next residue sum to roughly −75°. For comparison, the sum of the dihedral angles for an α-helix is roughly −105°, whereas that for a π-helix is roughly −125°.

The general formula for the rotation angle Ω per residue of any polypeptide helix with trans isomers is given by the equation:

$$3 \cos \Omega = 1 - 4 \cos^{2} \left(\frac{\varphi + \psi}{2} \right)$$

and since Ω = 120° for an ideal 3_{10} helix, it follows that φ and ψ should be related by:

$$\cos \left(\frac{\varphi + \psi}{2} \right) = \frac{\sqrt{10}}{4},$$

consistent with the observed value of φ + ψ near −75°.

The dihedral angles in the 3_{10} helix, relative to those of the α helix, could be attributed to the short lengths of these helices – anywhere from 3 to 5 residues long, compared with the 10 to 12 residue lengths of their α-helix contemporaries. 3_{10}-helices often arise in transitions, leading to typically short residue lengths that result in deviations in their main-chain torsion angle distributions and thus irregularities. Their hydrogen bond networks are distorted when compared with α-helices, contributing to their instability, though the frequent appearance of the 3_{10}-helix in natural proteins demonstrate their importance in transitional structures.

== Stability ==
Through research carried out by Mary Karpen, Pieter De Haseth and Kenneth Neet, factors in the partial stability in 3_{10}-helices were uncovered. The helices are most noticeably stabilized by an aspartate residue at the nonpolar N-terminus that interacts with the amide group at the helical N-cap. This electrostatic interaction stabilizes the peptide dipoles in a parallel orientation. Much like the contiguous helical hydrogen bonds that stabilize α-helices, high levels of aspartate are just as equally important in the survival of the 3_{10}-helix. High frequency of aspartate in both 3_{10}-helix and α-helices is indicative of its helix initiation, but at the same time suggests that it favors stabilization of the 3_{10}-helix by inhibiting the propagation of α-helices.

== See also ==
- alpha helix
- pi helix
- secondary structure
- beta turn
- beta bend ribbon

== Other readings ==
- A 3_{10} Helix Is a Type of Protein Secondary." Biochemistries. N.p., 20 Oct. 2013. Web. 06 Dec. 2015. <http://biochemistri.es/the-3-10-helix%5B%5D>.
