= Phytase =

Class of enzymes

Phytate

A phytase (myo-inositol hexakisphosphate phosphohydrolase) is any type of phosphatase enzyme that catalyzes the hydrolysis of phytic acid (myo-inositol hexakisphosphate) – an indigestible, organic form of phosphorus that is found in many plant tissues, especially in grains and oil seeds – and releases a usable form of inorganic phosphorus. While phytases have been found to occur in animals, plants, fungi and bacteria, phytases have been most commonly detected and characterized from fungi.

== History ==
The first plant phytase was found in 1907 from rice bran and in 1908 from an animal (calf's liver and blood). In 1962 began the first attempt at commercializing phytases for animal feed nutrition enhancing purposes when International Minerals & Chemicals (IMC) studied over 2000 microorganisms to find the most suitable ones for phytase production. This project was launched in part due to concerns about mineable sources for inorganic phosphorus eventually running out (see peak phosphorus), which IMC was supplying for the feed industry at the time. Aspergillus (ficuum) niger fungal strain NRRL 3135 (ATCC 66876) was identified as a promising candidate as it was able to produce large amounts of extracellular phytases. However, the organism's efficiency was not enough for commercialization so the project ended in 1968 as a failure.

Still, identifying A. niger led in 1984 to a new attempt with A. niger mutants made with the relatively recently invented recombinant DNA technology. This USDA funded project was initiated by Dr. Rudy Wodzinski who formerly participated in the IMC's project. This 1984 project led in 1991 to the first partially cloned phytase gene phyA (from A. niger NRRL 31235) and later on in 1993 to the cloning of the full gene and its overexpression in A. niger.

In 1991 BASF began to sell the first commercial phytase produced in A. niger under the trademark Natuphos which was used to increase the nutrient content of animal feed.

In 1999 Escherichia coli bacterial phytases were identified as being more effective than A. niger fungal phytases. Subsequently, this led to the animal feed use of this new generation of bacterial phytases which were superior to fungal phytases in many aspects.

== Classes ==
Four distinct structural classes of phytase have been characterized in the literature: histidine acid phosphatases (HAPS), beta-propeller phytases (BPPs), purple acid phosphatases (PAPs), and most recently, protein tyrosine phosphatase-like phytases (PTP-like phytases).

=== Histidine acid phosphatases (HAPs) ===
Most of the known phytases belong to a class of enzyme called histidine acid phosphatases (HAPs). HAPs have been isolated from filamentous fungi, bacteria, yeast, and plants. All members of this class of phytase share a common active site sequence motif (Arg-His-Gly-X-Arg-X-Pro) and have a two-step mechanism that hydrolyzes phytic acid (as well as some other phosphoesters). The phytase from the fungus Aspergillus niger is a HAP and is well known for its high specific activity and its commercially marketed role as an animal feed additive to increase the bioavailability of phosphate from phytic acid in the grain-based diets of poultry and swine. HAPs have also been overexpressed in several transgenic plants as a potential alternative method of phytase production for the animal feed industry and very recently, the HAP phytase gene from E. coli has been successfully expressed in a transgenic pig.

=== β-propeller phytases ===
β-propeller phytases make up a recently discovered class of phytase. These first examples of this class of enzyme were originally cloned from Bacillus species, but numerous microorganisms have since been identified as producing β-propeller phytases. The three-dimensional structure of β-propeller phytase is similar to a propeller with six blades. Current research suggests that β-propeller phytases are the major phytate-degrading enzymes in water and soil, and may play a major role in phytate-phosphorus cycling.

=== Purple acid phosphatases ===
A phytase has recently been isolated from the cotyledons of germinating soybeans that has the active site motif of a purple acid phosphatase (PAP). This class of metalloenzyme has been well studied and searches of genomic databases reveal PAP-like sequences in plants, mammals, fungi, and bacteria. However, only the PAP from soybeans has been found to have any significant phytase activity. The three-dimensional structure, active-site sequence motif and proposed mechanism of catalysis have been determined for PAPs.

=== Protein tyrosine phosphatase-like phytases ===
Only a few of the known phytases belong to a superfamily of enzymes called protein tyrosine phosphatases (PTPs). PTP-like phytases, a relatively newly discovered class of phytase, have been isolated from bacteria that normally inhabit the gut of ruminant animals. All characterized PTP-like phytases share an active site sequence motif (His-Cys-(X)5-Arg), a two-step, acid-base mechanism of dephosphorylation, and activity towards phosphorylated tyrosine residues, characteristics that are common to all PTP superfamily enzymes. Like many PTP superfamily enzymes, the exact biological substrates and roles of bacterial PTP-like phytases have not yet been clearly identified. The characterized PTP-like phytases from ruminal bacteria share sequence and structural homology with the mammalian PTP-like phosphoinositide/-inositol phosphatase PTEN, and significant sequence homology to the PTP domain of a type III-secreted virulence protein from Pseudomonas syringae (HopPtoD2).

== Biochemical characteristics ==
=== Substrate specificity ===
Most phytases show a broad substrate specificity, having the ability to hydrolyze many phosphorylated compounds that are not structurally similar to phytic acid such as ADP, ATP, phenyl phosphate, fructose 1,6-bisphosphate, glucose 6-phosphate, glycerophosphate and 3-phosphoglycerate. Only a few phytases have been described as highly specific for phytic acid, such as phytases from Bacillus sp., Aspergillus sp., E. coli and those phytases belonging to the class of PTP-like phytases.

=== Pathways of phytic acid dephosphorylation ===
Phytic acid has six phosphate groups that may be released by phytases at different rates and in different order. Phytases hydrolyze phosphates from phytic acid in a stepwise manner, yielding products that again become substrates for further hydrolysis. Most phytases are able to cleave five of the six phosphate groups from phytic acid. Phytases have been grouped based on the first phosphate position of phytic acid that is hydrolyzed. The Enzyme Nomenclature Committee of the International Union of Biochemistry recognizes three types of phytases based on the position of the first phosphate hydrolyzed, those are 3-phytase (EC 3.1.3.8), 4-phytase (EC 3.1.3.26), and 5-phytase (EC 3.1.3.72). To date, most of the known phytases are 3-phytases or 4-phytases, only a HAP purified from lily pollen and a PTP-like phytase from Selenomonas ruminantium subsp. lactilytica have been determined to be 5-phytases.

== Biological relevance ==
Phytic acid and its metabolites have several important roles in seeds and grains, most notably, phytic acid functions as a phosphorus store, as an energy store, as a source of cations and as a source of myo-inositol (a cell wall precursor). Phytic acid is the principal storage forms of phosphorus in plant seeds and the major source of phosphorus in the grain-based diets used in intensive livestock operations. The organic phosphate found in phytic acid is largely unavailable to the animals that consume it, but the inorganic phosphate that phytases release can be easily absorbed. Ruminant animals can use phytic acid as a source of phosphorus because the bacteria that inhabit their gut are well characterized producers of many types of phytases. However, monogastric animals do not carry bacteria that produce phytase, thus, these animals cannot use phytic acid as a major source of phosphorus and it is excreted in the feces. However, human—especially vegetarians and vegans due to increased gut microbiome adaptation—can have microbes in their gut that can produce phytase that break down phytic acid.

Phytic acid and its metabolites have several other important roles in Eukaryotic physiological processes. As such, phytases, which hydrolyze phytic acid and its metabolites, also have important roles. Phytic acid and its metabolites have been implicated in DNA repair, clathrin-coated vesicular recycling, control of neurotransmission and cell proliferation. The exact roles of phytases in the regulation of phytic acid and its metabolites and the resulting role in the physiological processes described above are still largely unknown and the subject of much research.

Phytase has been reported to cause hypersensitivity pneumonitis in a human exposed while adding the enzyme to cattle feed.

== Agricultural and industrial uses ==
Phytase is produced by bacteria found in the gut of ruminant animals (cattle, sheep) making it possible for them to use the phytic acid found in grains as a source of phosphorus. Non-ruminants (monogastric animals) like human beings, dogs, pigs, birds, etc. do not produce phytase. Research in the field of animal nutrition has put forth the idea of supplementing feed with phytase so as to make available to the animal phytate-bound nutrients like calcium, phosphorus, minerals, carbohydrates, amino acids and proteins. In Canada, a genetically modified pig called Enviropig, which has the capability to produce phytase primarily through its salivary glands, was developed and approved for limited production.

Phytase is used as an animal feed supplement – often in poultry and swine – to enhance the nutritive value of plant material by liberation of inorganic phosphate from phytic acid (myo-inositol hexakisphosphate). Phytase can be purified from transgenic microbes and has been produced recently in transgenic canola, alfalfa and rice plants. Phytase has also been produced from cultivated Rhizopus oligosporus.
