= Y Y Y =

Protein domain

Y_Y_Y

Identifiers
- Symbol: Y_Y_Y
- Pfam: PF07495
- Pfam clan: CL0159
- InterPro: IPR011123
Available protein structures:
- Pfam: structures / ECOD
- PDB: RCSB PDB; PDBe; PDBj
- PDBsum: structure summary

In molecular biology, the YYY domain is a protein domain that is considered to be important in bacterial signal transduction, however the exact function of this protein domain is not known. It is named after the three conserved tyrosines found in the alignment. The domain forms part of the periplasmic sensor domain which binds to unsaturated disaccharides.

== Structure ==
This region is mostly found to the C-terminus of the beta propellers (INTERPRO) in a family of two component regulators. However they are also found tandemly repeated in SWISSPROT without other signal conduction domains being present. The structure of this domain contains 8 beta strands organised into a beta sandwich Immunoglobulin-like fold.
