= Beta helix =

Protein structure

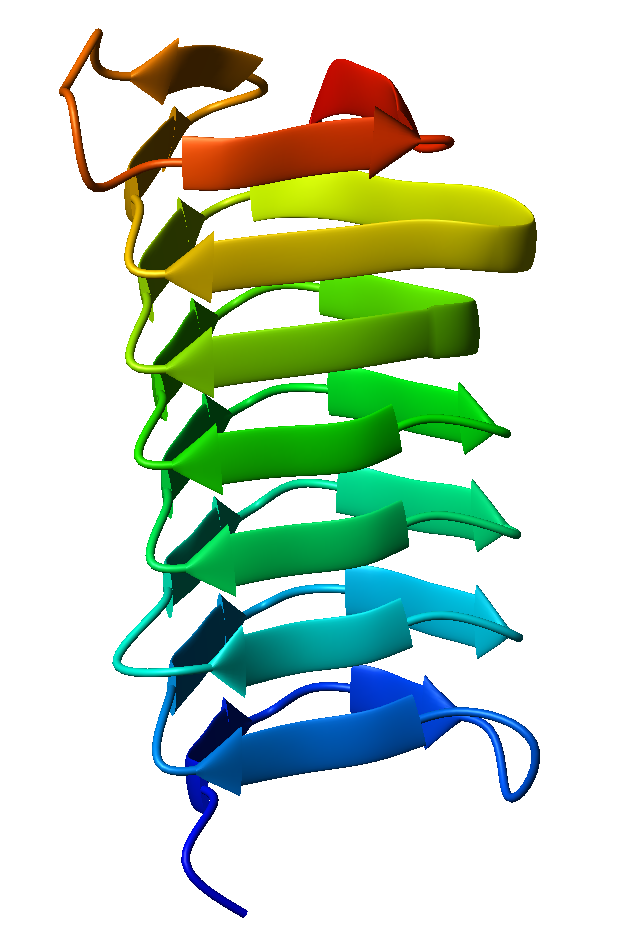
Monomeric, left-handed β-helix antifreeze protein from the spruce budworm Choristoneura fumiferana (PDB: 1M8N).

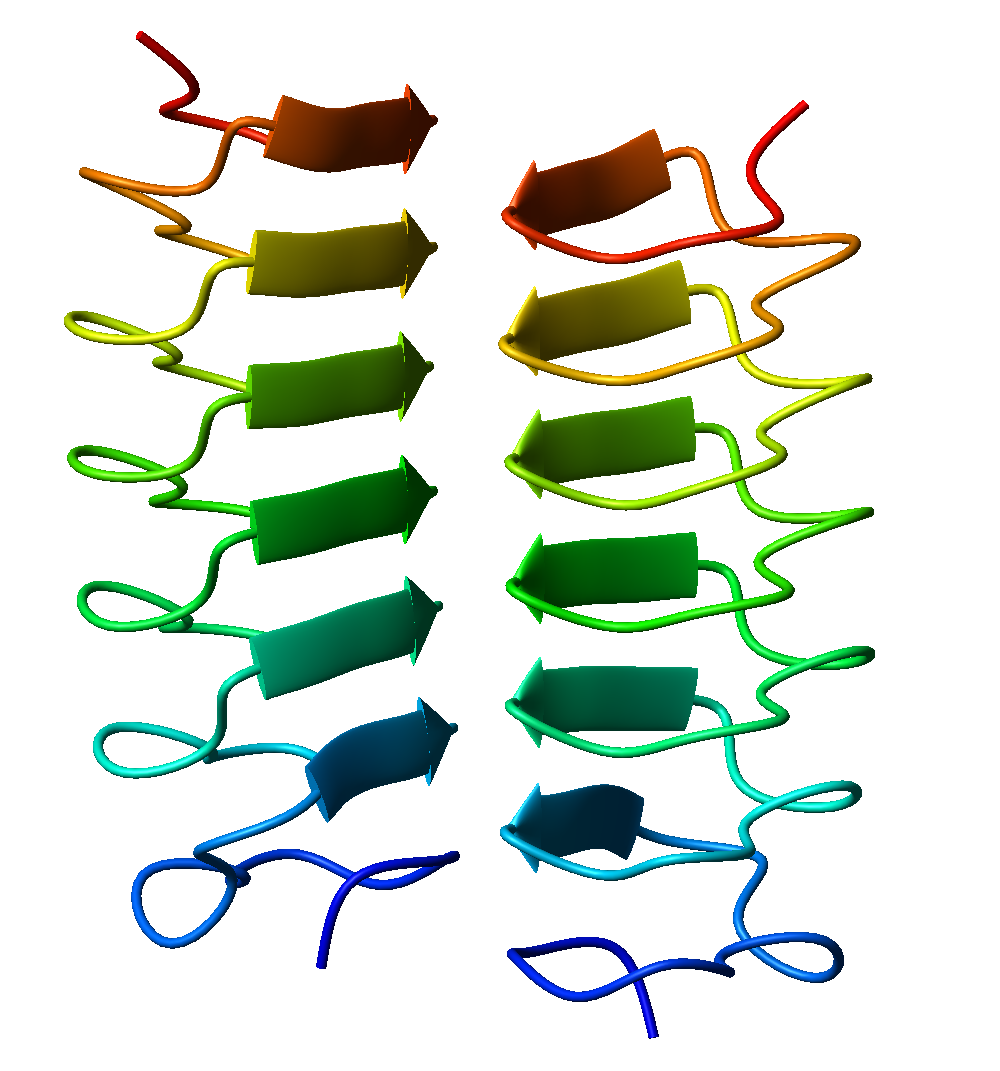
Dimeric, right-handed β-helix antifreeze protein from the beetle Tenebrio molitor (PDB: 1EZG). Face-to-face association of β-helices.

A beta helix is a tandem protein repeat structure formed by the association of parallel beta sheet in a helical pattern with either two or three faces. The beta helix is a type of solenoid protein domain. The structure is stabilized by inter-strand hydrogen bonds, protein-protein interactions, and sometimes bound metal ions. Both left- and right-handed beta helices have been identified. These structures are distinct from jelly-roll folds, a different protein structure sometimes known as a "double-stranded beta helix".

The first beta-helix was observed in the enzyme pectate lyase, which contains a seven-turn helix that reaches 34 Å (3.4 nm) long. The P22 phage tail spike protein, a component of the P22 bacteriophage, has 13 turns and in its assembled homotrimer is 200 Å (20 nm) in length. Its interior is close-packed with no central pore and contains both hydrophobic residues and charged residues neutralized by salt bridges.

Both pectate lyase and P22 tailspike protein contain right-handed helices; left-handed versions have been observed in enzymes such as UDP-N-acetylglucosamine acyltransferase and archaeal carbonic anhydrase. Other proteins that contain beta helices include the antifreeze proteins from the beetle Tenebrio molitor (right-handed) and from the spruce budworm, Choristoneura fumiferana (left-handed), where regularly spaced threonines on the β-helices bind to the surface of ice crystals and inhibit their growth.

Beta helices can associate with each other effectively, either face-to-face (mating the faces of their triangular prisms) or end-to-end (forming hydrogen bonds). Hence, β-helices can be used as "tags" to induce other proteins to associate, similar to coiled coil segments.

Members of the pentapeptide repeat family have been shown to possess a quadrilateral beta-helix structure.
