= Reg prop =

Reg_prop

Identifiers
- Symbol: Reg_prop
- Pfam: PF07494
- Pfam clan: CL0186
- InterPro: IPR011110
Available protein structures:
- Pfam: structures / ECOD
- PDB: RCSB PDB; PDBe; PDBj
- PDBsum: structure summary

In molecular biology, the Reg_prop protein domain is part of the periplasmic sensor domain which binds to unsaturated disaccharides. Although the precise function of this protein domain remains to be elucidated, it is thought that it plays a role in cell signalling.

== Structure ==
A large group of two component regulator proteins appear to have the same N-terminal structure of 14 tandem repeats. These repeats show homology to members of INTERPRO and INTERPRO indicating that they are likely to form a beta-propeller. The fourteen repeats are likely to form two propellers; it is not clear if these structures are likely to recruit other proteins or interact with DNA.

== Examples ==
Examples that contain this protein domain include:

- gut microbiota, Bacteroides
