= Ferredoxin fold =

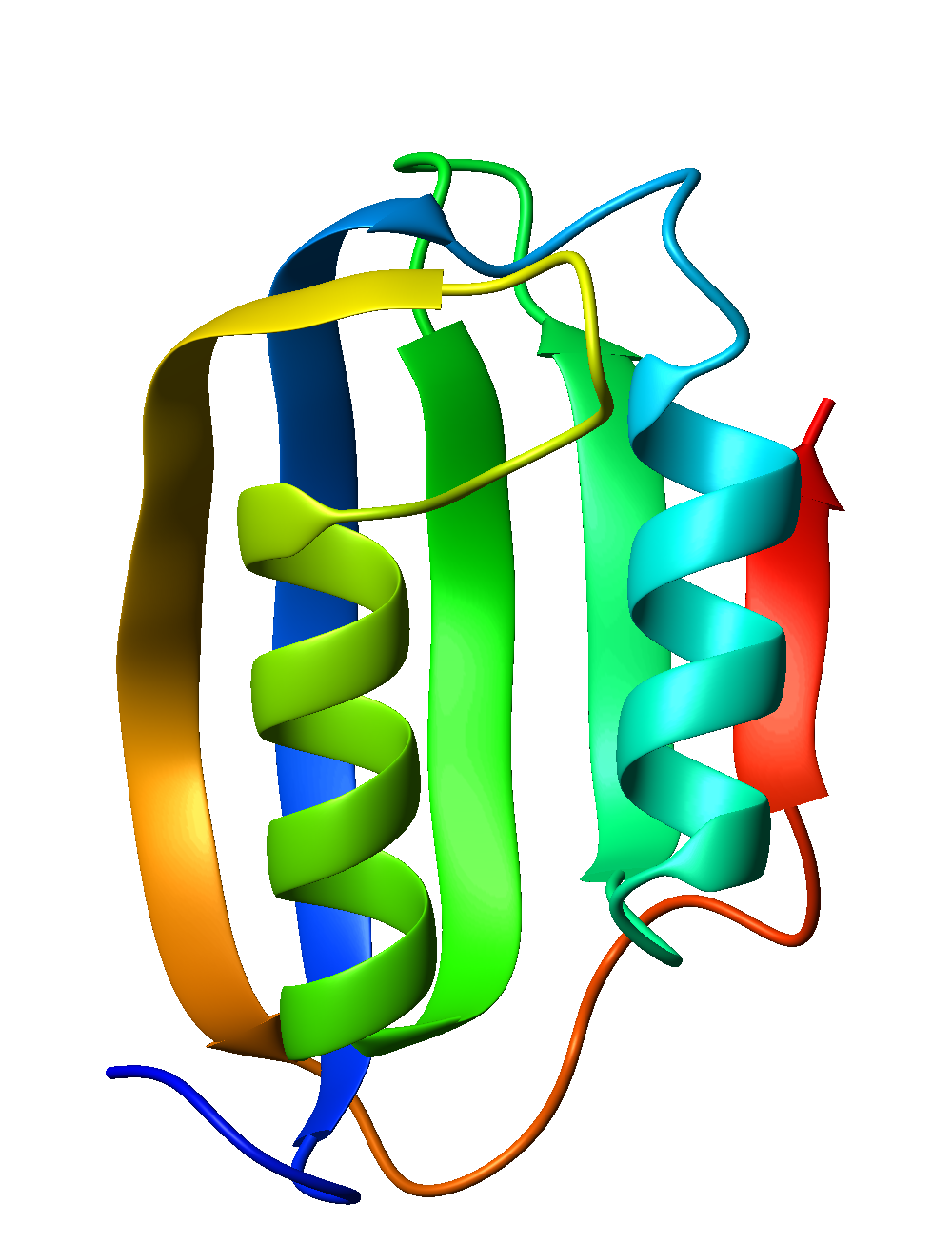
Ribbon diagram of acylphosphatase (PDB accession code 2ACY), which adopts a ferredoxin fold with an extra β-strand at the C-terminus (shown in red). The ribbon is colored from blue (N-terminus) to red (C-terminus).

In protein structure, a ferredoxin fold is a common α+β protein fold with a signature βαββαβ secondary structure along its backbone. Structurally, the ferredoxin fold can be regarded as a long, symmetric hairpin that is wrapped once around, so that its two terminal β-strands hydrogen-bond to the central two β-strands, forming a four-stranded, antiparallel β-sheet covered on one side by two α-helices.
