= Francisco Blanco =

Francisco Blanco may refer to:

- Francisco J. Blanco, Spanish structural biologist
- Francisco Blanco (martyr) (c.1570–1597), Spanish Roman Catholic Franciscan missionary and martyr
- Francisco Manuel Blanco (1778–1845), Spanish friar and botanist
