= Flavodoxin fold =

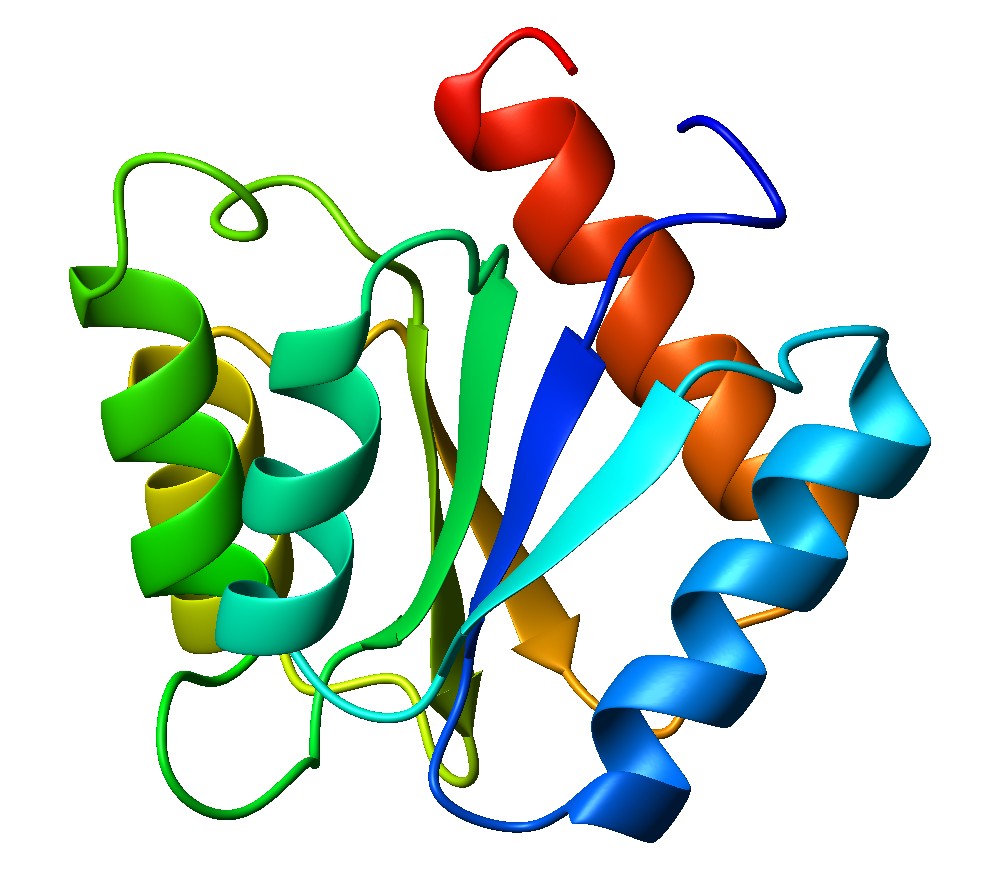
Ribbon diagram of CheY (a regulator of the chemotactic response in bacteria, PDB accession code 3CHY), which adopts the flavodoxin fold. Ribbon is colored from blue (N-terminus) to red (C-terminus).

The flavodoxin fold is a common structural motif, α/β protein fold, second only to the TIM barrel fold. It has three layers, with two α-helical layers sandwiching a 5-stranded parallel β-sheet. The order of strands within the sheet is 2-1-3-4-5. The Flavodoxin fold is found in many proteins in different organisms like algae, fungi, plants and mammals. This specific structural fold is important to researchers because it is commonly found in proteins among many different organisms.

== Origin and evolution ==
The flavodoxin fold has been proposed to be one of the earliest protein folds, emerging as the sixth fold, in some models, during the evolution of protein architectures. This fold is evolutionary ancient but is now absent from most eukaryotes. The fold can still be found in the proteins of human biological system like Cytochrome P450 reductase and Nitric oxide synthase. It can also be found bacteria and viruses.

== Flavodoxin protein ==
Flavodoxin is the origin protein from which the motif derives its name from. Flavodoxin is a type of protein that is created when there is a lack of iron presence and then it replaces the proteins that contain iron. It is made up of α helices and β-strands. The β-strands are connected by either a loop or an α helix. The FLD gene codes for the Flavodoxin protein and can either be short chained or long chained with the long chain having approximately 20 residues in a loop. Gram positive bacteria only contain short chain Flavodoxins. Cyanobacteria and algae most commonly contain the long chain Flavodoxin. Flavodoxins contain a singular Flavin mononucleotide, also known as FMN.

== Other proteins with a similar structure ==
This motif is present for example in Cytochrome P450 reductase, lactate dehydrogenase (PDB: 1A5Z), phosphoglycerate kinase (PDB: 1FW8), and nitrate oxide synthase. These four proteins are all found in the human body.

=== Cytochrome P450 reductase ===
Cytochrome P450 reductase does contain proteins with the flavodoxin fold. The FMN-binding domain, connecting domain, and FAD- domain, and NADPH-binding domain are the four Cytochrome P450 reductase domains ranging from the N- terminal to the C- terminal. The flavodoxin fold is located in the FMN binding domain. The motif binds Flavin mononucleotide (FMN). Cytochrome P450 reductase can be found in the genomes of giant viruses like Mimiviridae and pandoraviridae.

=== Lactate dehydrogenase ===
Lactate dehydrogenase (LDH) does not contain the flavodoxin fold but has α/β fold known as the Rossmann fold which consists of 6 parallel β-strands and α-helices.

=== Phosphoglycerate kinase ===
Phosphoglycerate kinase is a key enzyme in making ATP. This protein structure does not contain the flavodoxin fold, but has the same β-strand, α-helix and β-strand pattern. It has the Rossman fold like lactate dehydrogenase. It binds to several different ligands like FMN, FAD, haem, chromophores and fatty acids.

=== Nitrate oxide synthase ===
Nitric oxide synthase contains proteins with the flavodoxin-fold like structure in the FMN-binding domain similar to Phosphoglycerate Kinase and Cytochrome P450 Reductase listed above. A separate domain in nitrate oxide synthase known as NOSox (oxygenase) interacts with substrates, intermediates and inhibitors.
