= Sar RNA =

sar RNA
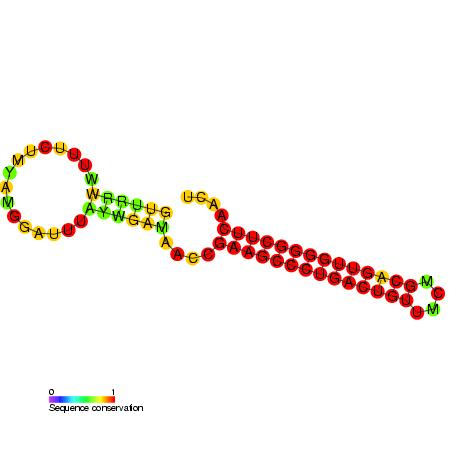
- Predicted secondary structure and sequence conservation of sar

Identifiers
- Symbol: sar
- Rfam: RF00262

Other data
- RNA type: Gene; antisense
- Domain(s): Bacteria; Viruses
- GO: GO:0003729
- SO: SO:0000644
- PDB structures: PDBe

Sar RNA is an antisense non-coding RNA that is partly responsible for the negative regulation of antirepressor synthesis during development of bacteriophage P22. The target of Sar RNA is ant mRNA. Structurally, Sar RNA forms two stem-loops.
