= Beta bulge loop =

Protein structural motif

Beta bulge loops are commonly occurring motifs in proteins and polypeptides consisting of five to six amino acids. There are two types: type 1, which is a pentapeptide; and type 2, with six amino acids. They are regarded as a type of beta bulge, and have the alternative name of type G1 beta bulge. Compared to other beta bulges, beta bulge loops give rise to chain reversal such that they often occur at the loop ends of beta hairpins; hairpins of this sort can be described as 3:5 (for a type 1 β bulge loop) or 4:6 (for type 2).

Type 1 beta bulge loop. Main chain atoms only of hexapeptide; no hydrogen atoms. Carbons grey, oxygens red and nitrogens blue. The two characteristic hydrogen bonds are shown as green and purple lines

Type I beta bulge loops have two characteristic inter-main-chain hydrogen bonds. One is between the CO of residue i and the NH of residue i+3 (a β-turn); the other is between the CO of residue i+4 and the NH of residue i.

Type 2 beta bulge loops have two characteristic inter-main-chain hydrogen bonds. One is between the CO of residue i and the NH of residue i+4 (an α-turn); the other is between the CO of residue i+5 and the NH of residue i.

Beta bulge loops often have an aspartate, asparagine, serine or threonine at residue i, together with a nest (protein structural motif) at residues i+2 to i+4 (type 1) or residues i+3 to i+5 (type 2), with the side chain oxygen binding to the main chain NH groups of the nest. Site-directed mutagenesis of asx residues within a protein's β bulge loops has been described, showing that the side chain of an asx residue at various alternative positions within a β bulge loop binds to the nest and thereby helps stabilize the loop.

Two websites are available for finding and examining beta bulge loops in proteins, Motivated Proteins: and ExploreTurns: . In addition to the beta bulge loop types described above, ExploreTurns supports the browsing and analysis of multiple less common types that satisfy a generalized definition which describes all short loops with a split pair of backbone H-bonds at either terminus, in which one of the H-bonds links the termini, defining the structure's extent, while the other links to an interior loop residue, forming the motif's bulge and an interior H-bonded turn. This definition includes loop types that encompass up to 8 residues, with bulges at either or both termini (see schematics in the ExploreTurns loop motif browser). Like the "classic" beta bulge loop types, the types satisfying the generalized loop definition may be found in beta hairpins and ligand binding and active sites; examples include metal ion, iron-sulfur cluster, RNA, and DNA binders.
