= Protein fold class =

Categories of protein tertiary structure

A summary of functional annotation of the most ancestral translation protein folds

In molecular biology, protein fold classes are broad categories of protein tertiary structure topology. They describe groups of proteins that share similar amino acid and secondary structure proportions. Each class contains multiple, independent protein superfamilies (i.e. are not necessarily evolutionarily related to one another).

== Generally recognised classes ==
Four large classes of protein that are generally agreed upon by the two main structure classification databases (SCOP and CATH).

=== all-α ===
All-α proteins are a class of structural domains in which the secondary structure is composed entirely of α-helices, with the possible exception of a few isolated β-sheets on the periphery.

Common examples include the bromodomain, the globin fold and the homeobox.

=== all-β ===
All-β proteins are a class of structural domains in which the secondary structure is composed entirely of β-sheets, with the possible exception of a few isolated α-helices on the periphery.

Common examples include the SH3 domain, the beta-propeller domain, the immunoglobulin fold and B3 DNA binding domain.

=== α+β ===
α+β proteins are a class of structural domains in which the secondary structure is composed of α-helices and β-strands that occur separately along the backbone. The β-strands are therefore mostly antiparallel.

Common examples include the ferredoxin fold, ribonuclease A, and the SH2 domain.

=== α/β ===
α/β proteins are a class of structural domains in which the secondary structure is composed of alternating α-helices and β-strands along the backbone. The β-strands are therefore mostly parallel.

Common examples include the flavodoxin fold, the TIM barrel and leucine-rich-repeat (LRR) proteins such as ribonuclease inhibitor.

== Additional classes ==
=== Membrane proteins ===
Membrane proteins interact with biological membranes either by inserting into it, or being tethered via a covalently attached lipid. They are one of the common types of protein along with soluble globular proteins, fibrous proteins, and disordered proteins. They are targets of over 50% of all modern medicinal drugs. It is estimated that 20–30% of all genes in most genomes encode membrane proteins.

=== Intrinsically disordered proteins ===
Intrinsically disordered proteins lack a fixed or ordered three-dimensional structure. IDPs cover a spectrum of states from fully unstructured to partially structured and include random coils, (pre-)molten globules, and large multi-domain proteins connected by flexible linkers. They constitute one of the main types of protein (alongside globular, fibrous and membrane proteins).

=== Coiled coil proteins ===
Coiled coil proteins form long, insoluble fibers involved in the extracellular matrix. There are many scleroprotein superfamilies including keratin, collagen, elastin, and fibroin. The roles of such proteins include protection and support, forming connective tissue, tendons, bone matrices, and muscle fiber.

=== Small proteins ===
Small proteins typically have a tertiary structure that is maintained by disulphide bridges (cysteine-rich proteins), metal ligands (metal-binding proteins), and or cofactors such as heme.

=== Designed proteins ===
Numerous protein structures are the result of rational design and do not exist in nature. Proteins can be designed from scratch (de novo design) or by making calculated variations on a known protein structure and its sequence (known as protein redesign). Rational protein design approaches make protein-sequence predictions that will fold to specific structures. These predicted sequences can then be validated experimentally through methods such as peptide synthesis, site-directed mutagenesis, or Artificial gene synthesis.

== See also ==
- Protein superfamily
- SCOP database
- CATH database
- FSSP database
