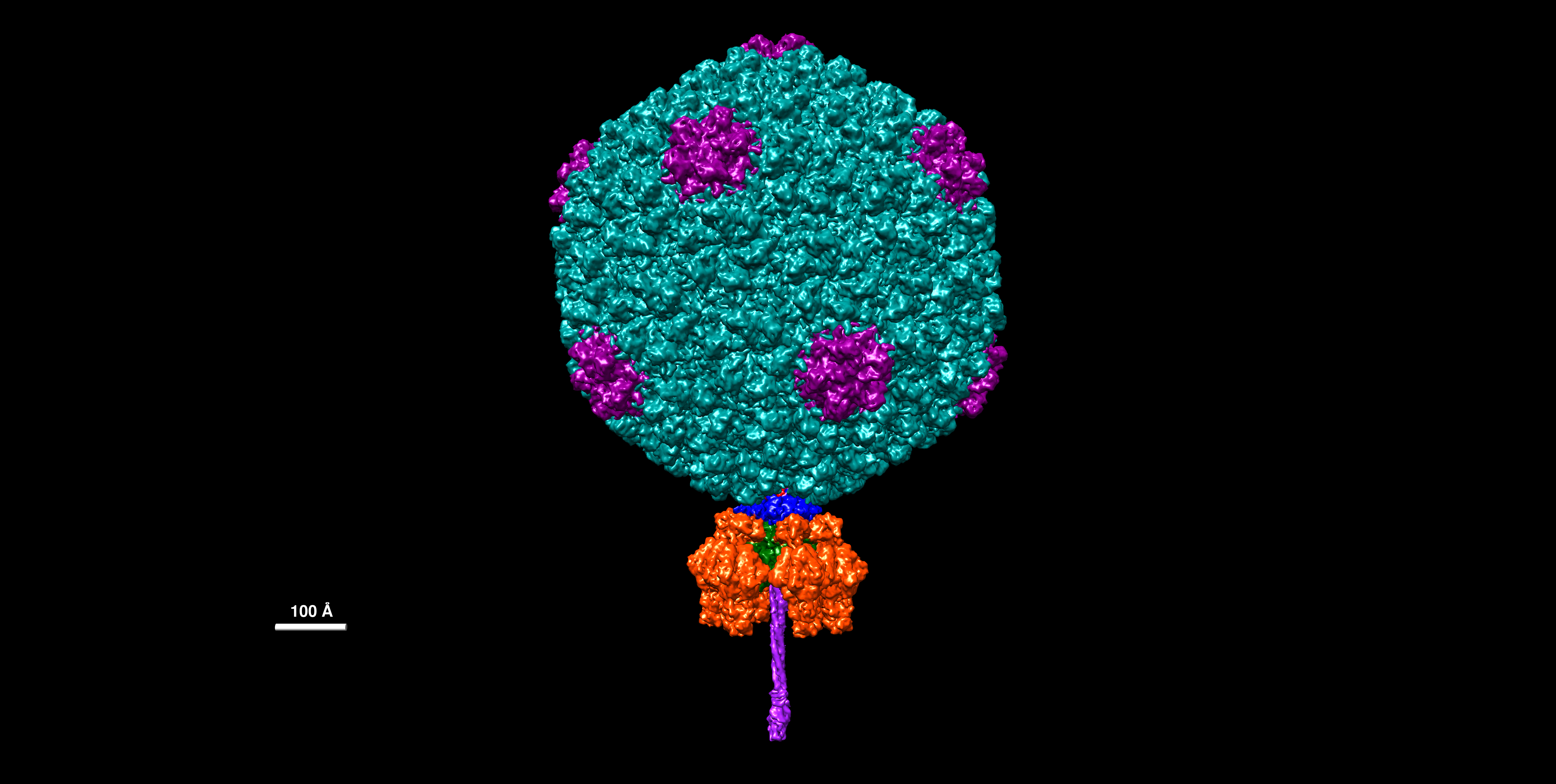

Virus classification
- (unranked): Virus
- Realm: Duplodnaviria
- Kingdom: Heunggongvirae
- Phylum: Uroviricota
- Class: Caudoviricetes
- Genus: Lederbergvirus
- Species: Lederbergvirus P22

Synonyms
- Salmonella virus P22

= Lederbergvirus P22 =

Bacteriophage P22

Species of virus

Salmonella virus P22 is a bacterial virus (bacteriophage) that infects Salmonella typhimurium. Like many phages, it has been used in molecular biology to induce mutations in cultured bacteria and to introduce foreign genetic material. P22 has been used in generalized transduction and is an important tool for investigating Salmonella genetics.

== Morphology, classification and relatives ==
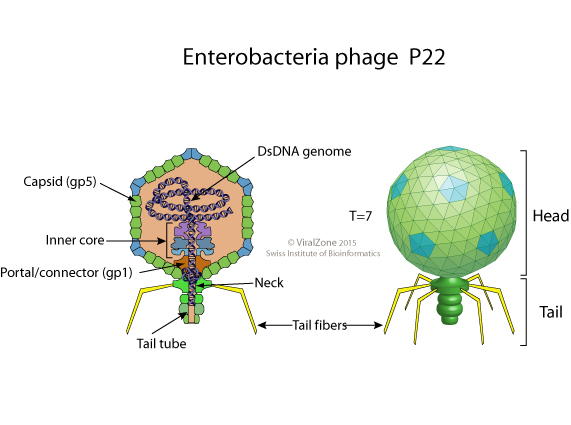
Schematic drawing of an Enterobacteria phage P22 virion (cross section and side view)

P22 shares many similarities in genetic structure and regulation with bacteriophage λ. It is a temperate double stranded DNA phage as well as a lambdoid phage since it carries control of gene expression regions and early operons similar to those of bacteriophage λ. However, the genes which encode proteins that build the virion are different from those of bacteriophage λ. P22 has a 60 nm diameter icosahedral (T=7) virion head and a short tail. This virion morphology puts P22 in the formal Podoviridae group. Traditionally, P22 is associated with viruses with similar genomic transcription patterns and life cycles including bacteriophage λ and all the other lambdoid phages. However, this relatedness seems to be overestimated. Other relatives with similar short-tailed morphology and DNA homology in the protein genes of the virion include bacteriophages λ and Ε34. Many Podoviridae, for example phages T7 and Φ29, share few DNA similarities with P22, even though their virion morphologies are similar.

== Genomics ==
P22 tail accessory factor

Identifiers
- Symbol: P22_Tail-4
- Pfam: PF11650
- InterPro: IPR020362
Available protein structures:
- PDB: IPR020362 PF11650 (ECOD; PDBsum)
- AlphaFold: IPR020362; PF11650

P22 has a linear, double-stranded DNA chromosome within its virion that is about 44 kilobases long with blunt ends and a circular genetic map. However, its "wild type" nucleotide sequence is about 42 kilobases long. The genome of P22 has been sequenced and sixty five genes have been annotated. The sequencing results support the hypothesis that phage P22 is a virus that has evolved through extensive recombination with other viruses.

P22 research has focused on its differences from bacteriophage λ including the mechanisms by which it circularizes DNA upon infection and packages DNA into the virion. Prior to leaving the host cell, virion chromosomes are packaged into capsids from concatemers of the sequence that result from rolling circle DNA replication. The P22 packaged DNA carries a direct duplication of about 4% at both ends since the inside of the virion has more space than is filled by 100% of the sequence. This process is called "headful packaging" since replicated DNA is "stuffed" into the virion until it is full, rather than filling each virion with a single copy of the sequence. This usually encompasses 48Kb, so part of the host DNA is transferred along with the phage.

After host infection, the linear P22 virion DNA is circularized by a homologous recombination event between the direct repeats at both ends of the chromosome. This can be done by host rec gene products, but also by P22 recombination function genes in the absence of host enzymes. The circularized DNA containing one copy of the P22 nucleotide sequence is the substrate for gene expression and DNA replication.

== Life cycle ==
The P22 tailspike protein is anchored in the viral coat and used to aid in penetrating the membranes of host cells. P22's tailspike has an unusual beta helix fold. Infection begins when the gp9 tailspike of the P22 phage binds to the O-antigen lipopolysaccharide on the surface of Salmonella Typhimurium host. The virion's tail fiber protein has endorhamnosidase activity, which cleaves the O-antigen chain. Upon infection, P22 can enter either a lytic or lysogenic growth pathway. In the lytic pathway, viral replication proceeds immediately following infection and releases approximately 300–500 phage progeny via cell lysis within an hour. However, in the lysogenic pathway, the phage chromosome integrates into the host chromosome and is passed to daughter cells through cell division. The primary factor controlling the growth pathway is the multiplicity of infection (moi); high moi favors lysogenic pathway and low moi favors lytic pathway.

=== Assembly pathway ===
The viral capsid has been the subject of studies in P22 virus assembly. Like other large dsDNA viruses, P22 first builds a protein "procapsid" structure and then packages it with the DNA chromosome. P22 procapsid is assembled by a well-studied protein. About 250 molecules of scaffolding protein are present in the procapsid during assembly, but during DNA packaging, the scaffolding protein is released. The released scaffolding protein is not damaged and can re-assemble with newly synthesized coat protein to make more procapsids.

In laboratory infections, scaffolding protein molecules participate in 5 rounds of procapsid assembly on average. Since P22 scaffolding protein mediates the assembly of other proteins without becoming part of the finished structure, it is acting catalytically. The action scaffolding protein in procapsid assembly is common in other large icosahedral viruses including the herpes viruses of eukaryotes, but in some cases the scaffold is proteolytically removed instead of being reused. In addition, P22 scaffolding protein may represses the synthesis of additional scaffolding protein when not assembled into procapsids.

The products of three adjacent genes are required for the stabilization of the condensed DNA within P22 phage capsids: Gp4, Gp10 and Gp26. These proteins act by plugging the hole through which the DNA enters. These three proteins appear to polymerise onto the newly filled capsids to form the neck of the mature phage through which DNA will be injected into a cell. Gp4 (P22 tail accessory factor) is the first tail accessory factor to be added to newly DNA-filled capsids during P22-morphogenesis. In solution, the protein acts as a monomer and has low structural stability. The interaction of gp4 with the portal protein involves the binding of two non-equivalent sets of six gp4 proteins. Gp4 acts as a structural adaptor for gp10 and gp26, the other tail accessory factors.

== Application to Salmonella genetic research ==
Transduction has been used extensively in bacterial genetics and is useful in strain construction. In general, transduction within each bacterial species requires use of a specific phage; for example, P22 has been used for transduction in S. enterica sv. Typhimurium. A significant factor in the development of the genetics of S. enterica has been the ease of use of P22 for transductional crosses. In particular, P22 is stable in storage, high-titer stocks are easily obtained, and high-frequency transduction (HT) and integration-deficient mutants have been isolated.

== See also ==
- Sar RNA
