= Beta hairpin =

Protein structural motif

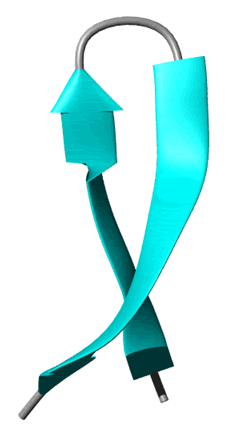
CGI representation of a β-hairpin

The beta hairpin (sometimes also called beta-ribbon or beta-beta unit) is a simple protein structural motif involving two beta strands that look like a hairpin. The motif consists of two strands that are adjacent in primary structure, oriented in an antiparallel direction (the N-terminus of one sheet is adjacent to the C-terminus of the next), and linked by a short loop of two to five amino acids. Beta hairpins can occur in isolation or as part of a series of hydrogen bonded strands that collectively comprise a beta sheet.

Researchers such as Francisco Blanco et al. have used protein NMR to show that beta-hairpins can be formed from isolated short peptides in aqueous solution, suggesting that hairpins could form nucleation sites for protein folding.

== Classification ==
Beta hairpins were originally categorized solely by the number of amino acid residues in their loop sequences, such that they were named one-residue, two-residue, etc. This system, however, is somewhat ambiguous as it does not take into account whether the residues that signal the end of the hairpin are singly or doubly hydrogen bonded to one another. An improved means of classification has since been proposed by Milner-White and Poet. Beta hairpins are broken into four distinct classes as depicted in the publication's Figure 1. Each class begins with the smallest possible number of loop residues and progressively increases the loop size by removing hydrogen bonds in the beta sheet. The primary hairpin of class 1 is a one-residue loop where the bound residues share two hydrogen bonds. One hydrogen bond is then removed to create a three-residue loop, which is the secondary hairpin of class 1. Singly bound residues are counted in the loop sequence but also signal the end of the loop, thus defining this hairpin as a three-residue loop. This single hydrogen bond is then removed to create the tertiary hairpin; a five-residue loop with doubly bound residues. This pattern continues indefinitely and defines all beta hairpins within the class. Class 2 follows the same pattern beginning with a two-residue loop with terminating residues that share two hydrogen bonds. Class 3 begins with a three-residue, and class 4 with a four-residue. Class 5 does not exist as that primary hairpin is already defined in class 1. Pi This classification scheme not only accounts for various degrees of hydrogen bonding, but also says something about the biological behavior of the hairpin. Single amino acid replacements may destroy a particular hydrogen bond, but will not unfold the hairpin or change its class. On the other hand, amino acid insertions and deletions will have to unfold and reform the entire beta strand in order to avoid a beta bulge in the secondary structure. This will change the class of the hairpin in the process. As substitutions are the most common amino acid mutations, a protein could potentially undergo a conversion without affecting the functionality of the beta hairpin.

== Folding and binding dynamics ==
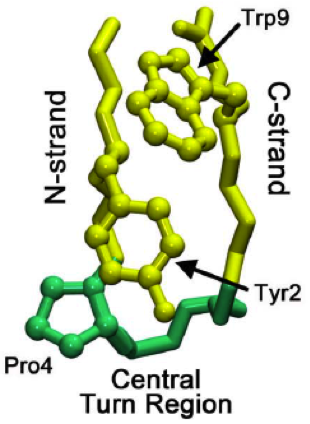
Native turn region of a beta-hairpin

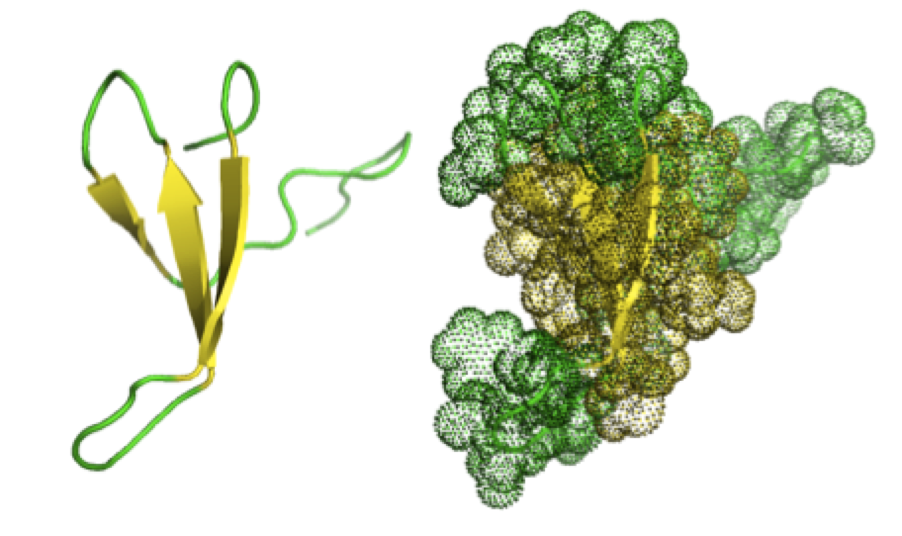
The Pin1 Domain. Peptidyl-prolyl cis-trans isomerase NIMA-interacting 1 (Pin1) – a 34-residue protein – is depicted above in two different ways. On the left, the reverse turns are easily seen in green, while the β-strands are seen in yellow. These come together to create a β-hairpin motif. The figure on the right depicts the same enzyme in a more three-dimensional aspect.

Understanding the mechanism through which micro-domains fold can help to shed light onto the folding patterns of whole proteins. Studies of a beta hairpin called chignolin (see Chignolin on Proteopedia) have uncovered a stepwise folding process that drives beta-hairpin folding. This hairpin has sequence features similar to over 13,000 known hairpins, and thus may serve as a more general model for beta hairpin formation. The formation of a native turn region signals the folding cascade to start, where a native turn is one that is present in the final folded structure.

In the folding of overall proteins, the turn may originate not in the native turn region but in the C-strand of the beta-hairpin. This turn then propagates through the C-strand (the beta strand leading to C-terminus) until it reaches the native turn region. Sometimes the residue interactions leading up to the native turn region are too strong, causing reverse propagation. However, once the native turn does form, interactions between prolines and tryptophan residues (seen in image at right) in the region help to stabilize the turn, preventing "roll back" or dissolution.

Researchers believe that turns do not originate in the N-strand, due to increased rigidity (often caused by a proline leading up to the native turn region) and less conformational options. The initial turn formation takes place in about 1 μs. Once the initial turn has been established, two mechanisms have been proposed as to how the rest of the beta-hairpin folds: a hydrophobic collapse with side-chain level rearrangements, or the more accepted zipper-like mechanism.

The β-hairpin loop motif can be found in many macromolecular proteins. However, small and simple β-hairpins can exist on their own as well. To see this clearly, the Pin1 Domain protein is shown to the left as an example.

Proteins that are β-sheet rich, also called WW domains, function by adhering to proline-rich and/or phosphorylated peptides to mediate protein–protein interactions. The "WW" refers to two tryptophan (W) residues that are conserved within the sequence and aid in the folding of the β-sheets to produce a small hydrophobic core. These tryptophan residues can be seen below (right) in red.

This enzyme binds its ligand through van der Waals forces of the conserved tryptophans and the proline-rich areas of the ligand. Other amino acids can then associate with the hydrophobic core of the β-hairpin structure to enforce secure binding.

It is also common to find proline residues within the actual loop portion of the β-hairpin, since this amino acid is rigid and contributes to the "turn" formation. These proline residues can be seen as red side chains in the image of the Pin1 WW domain below (left).

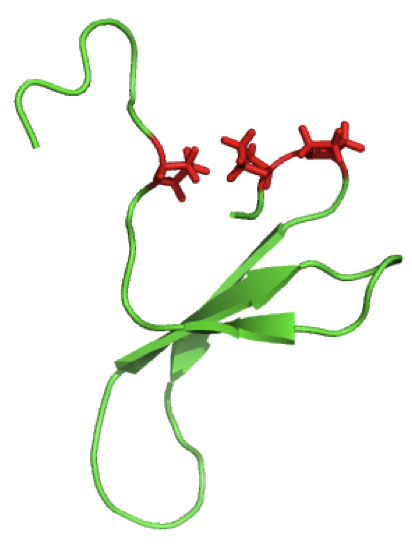
Pin1 wwdomain-Proline-rich loops

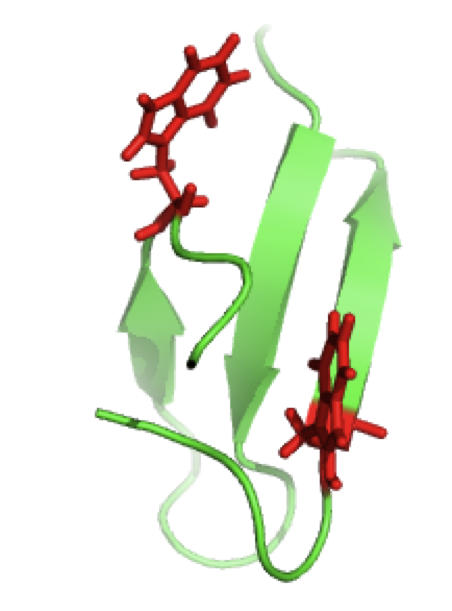
Pin1 wwdomain-Conserved Tryptophans

== Artificially designed beta-hairpin ==
The design of peptides that adopt β-hairpin structure (without relying on metal binding, unusual amino acids, or disulfide crosslinks) has made significant progress and yielded insights into protein dynamics. Unlike α-helices, β-hairpins are not stabilized by a regular hydrogen bonding pattern. As a result, early attempts required at least 20–30 amino acid residues to attain stable tertiary folds of β-hairpins. However, this lower limit was reduced to 12 amino acids by the stability gains conferred by the incorporation of tryptophan-tryptophan cross-strand pairs. Two nonhydrogen-bonding tryptophan pairs have been shown to interlock in a zipper-like motif, stabilizing the β-hairpin structure while still allowing it to remain water-soluble. The NMR structure of a tryptophan zipper (trpzip) β-peptide shows the stabilizing effect of favorable interactions between adjacent indole rings.

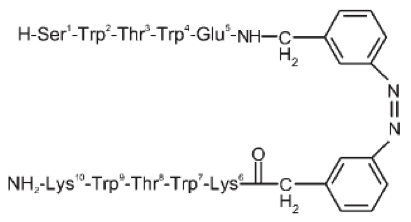
azobenzene hairpin

The synthesis of trpzip β-hairpin peptides has incorporated photoswitches that facilitate precise control over folding. Several amino acids in the turn are replaced by azobenzene, which can be induced to switch from the trans to the cis conformation by light at 360 nm. When the azobenzene moiety is in the cis conformation, the amino acid residues align correctly to adopt a β-hairpin formation. However, the trans conformation does not have proper turn geometry for the β-hairpin. This phenomenon can be used to investigate peptide conformational dynamics with femtosecond absorption spectroscopy.
