= Beta bulge =

A beta bulge can be described as a localized disruption of the regular hydrogen bonding of beta sheet by inserting extra residues into one or both hydrogen bonded β-strands.

== Types ==
β-bulges can be grouped according to their length of the disruption, the number of residues inserted into each strand, whether the disrupted β-strands are parallel or antiparallel and by their dihedral angles (which controls the placement of their side chains). Two types occur commonly. One, the classic beta bulge, occurs within, or at the edge of, antiparallel beta-sheet; the first residue at the outwards bulge typically has the α_{R}, rather than the normal β, conformation.

The other type is the G1 beta bulge, of which there are two common sorts, both mainly occurring in association with antiparallel sheet; one residue has the α_{L} conformation and is usually a glycine. In one sort, the beta bulge loop, one of the hydrogen bonds of the beta-bulge also forms a beta turn or alpha turn, such that the motif is often at the loop of a beta hairpin. In the other sort, the beta link, the beta bulge occurs in combination with, and overlaps, a type II beta turn.

== Effects on structure ==
At the level of the backbone structure, classic β-bulges can cause a simple aneurysm of the β-sheet, e.g., the bulge in the long β-hairpin of ribonuclease A (residues 88–91). A β-bulge can also cause a β-sheet to fold over and cross itself, e.g., when two residues with left-handed and right-handed α-helical dihedral angles are inserted opposite to each other in a β-hairpin, as occurs at Met9 and Asn16 in pseudoazurin (PDB accession code 1PAZ).

== Effect on Functionality of Proteins ==
Conserved bulges regularly affect protein functionality. The most basic function of bulges is to accommodate an extra residue added due to mutation etc., while maintaining the bonding pattern and thus the overall protein architecture. Other bulges are involved with protein binding sites. In specific cases like the Immunoglobulin family proteins, conserved bulges help dimerization of the Ig domains. They are also of functional importance in the proteins DHFR (Dihydrofolate Reductase) and SOD (Superoxide Dismutase), where loops containing bulges surround the active site.
