= 4-phytase =

Class of enzymes

Identifiers
- EC no.: 3.1.3.26
- CAS no.: 9001-89-2

Databases
- BRENDA: enzyme data
- ExPASy: NiceZyme view
- KEGG: enzyme entry
- MetaCyc: metabolic pathway
- Rhea: reactions
- PDB structures: RCSB PDB PDBe PDBsum
- Gene Ontology: AmiGO / QuickGO
Search
- PMC: articles
- PubMed: articles
- NCBI: proteins

The enzyme 4-phytase (EC 3.1.3.26) catalyzes the following reaction:

phytic acid
H_{2}O
P_{i}
1D-myo-inositol 1,2,3,5,6-pentakisphosphate

The enzyme characterised from wheat bran hydrolyses phytic acid (myo-inositol hexakisphosphate) to 1D-myo-inositol 1,2,3,5,6-pentakisphosphate and orthophosphate (P_{i}). Addition of this enzyme to the diet of broiler chickens has been shown to prevent loss of nutrients in their excretions.

The enzymes is a hydrolase, specifically one acting on phosphoric monoester bonds. The systematic name of this enzyme class is myo-inositol-hexakisphosphate 4-phosphohydrolase. Other names in common use include 6-phytase (name based on 1L-numbering system and not 1D-numbering) and phytate 6-phosphatase.

== See also ==
- 3-phytase (1-phytase)
- 5-phytase
- Protein tyrosine phosphatase
