= 5-phytase =

Class of enzymes

Identifiers
- EC no.: 3.1.3.72
- CAS no.: 357208-41-4

Databases
- BRENDA: enzyme data
- ExPASy: NiceZyme view
- KEGG: enzyme entry
- MetaCyc: metabolic pathway
- Rhea: reactions
- PDB structures: RCSB PDB PDBe PDBsum
- Gene Ontology: AmiGO / QuickGO
Search
- PMC: articles
- PubMed: articles
- NCBI: proteins

The enzyme 5-phytase (EC 3.1.3.72) catalyzes the reaction

phytic acid
H_{2}O
P_{i}
1L-myo-inositol 1,2,3,4,6-pentakisphosphate

The enzyme characterised from Lilium longiflorum pollen hydrolyses phytic acid (myo-inositol hexakisphosphate) to 1L-myo-inositol 1,2,3,4,6-pentakisphosphate and orthophosphate (P_{i}). Mechanistically, this is a histidine acid phosphatase. A protein tyrosine phosphatase-like phytase from Selenomonas ruminantium subsp. lactilytica has also been described. Both are specific for the 5-phosphate position of myo-inositol hexakisphosphate.

This enzyme is a hydrolase, specifically one acting on phosphoric monoester bonds. The systematic name of this enzyme class is myo-inositol-hexakisphosphate 5-phosphohydrolase.

== Structural studies ==
As of late 2007, only the phytase purified from lily pollen had its structure solved, with PDB accession codes PDB: 1U24, PDB: 1U25, PDB: 1U26, PDB: 2B4O, PDB: 2B4P, and PDB: 2B4U.

== See also ==
- 3-phytase (1-phytase)
- 4-phytase (6-phytase)
- Protein tyrosine phosphatase
