= 3-phytase =

Class of enzymes

Identifiers
- EC no.: 3.1.3.8
- CAS no.: 37288-11-2

Databases
- BRENDA: enzyme data
- ExPASy: NiceZyme view
- KEGG: enzyme entry
- MetaCyc: metabolic pathway
- Rhea: reactions
- PDB structures: RCSB PDB PDBe PDBsum
- Gene Ontology: AmiGO / QuickGO
Search
- PMC: articles
- PubMed: articles
- NCBI: proteins

The enzyme 3-phytase (EC 3.1.3.8) catalyzes the reaction

phytic acid
H_{2}O
P_{i}
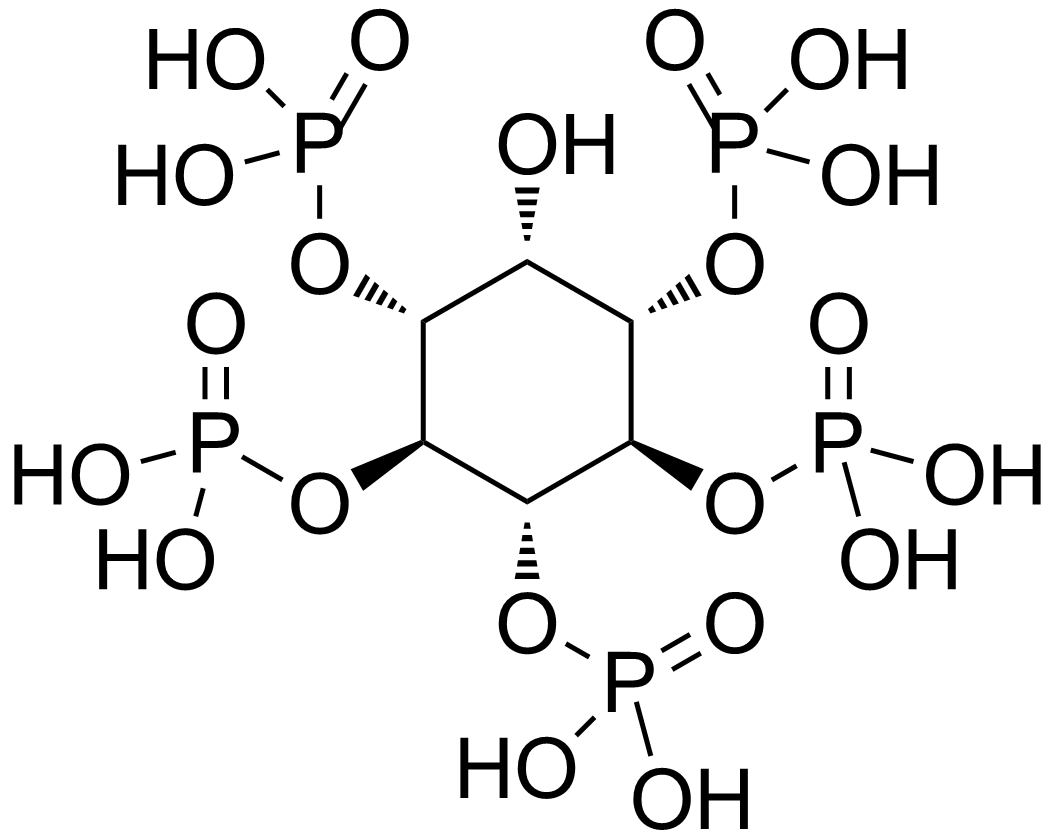
inositol pentakisphosphate

The enzyme characterised from Aspergillus ficuum hydrolyses phytic acid to inositol pentakisphosphate and orthophosphate. A genetically modified form of the enzyme has been evaluated for its safety in food manufacture.

These enzymes belongs to the family of hydrolases, specifically those acting on phosphoric monoester bonds. The systematic name myo-inositol-hexakisphosphate 3-phosphohydrolase. Other names in common use include 1-phytase, phytate 1-phosphatase, phytate 3-phosphatase, and phytate 6-phosphatase.

Enzymes of this type participate in inositol phosphate metabolism.

== Structural studies ==
As of late 2007, 12 structures have been solved for this class of enzymes, with PDB accession codes PDB: 1CVM, PDB: 1IHP, PDB: 1POO, PDB: 1QFX, PDB: 1QLG, PDB: 1QWO, PDB: 1SK8, PDB: 1SK9, PDB: 1SKA, PDB: 1SKB, PDB: 2GFI, and PDB: 2POO.

== See also ==
- 4-phytase (6-phytase)
- 5-phytase
- Protein tyrosine phosphatase
