= Phage P22 tailspike protein =

Bifunctional tail protein
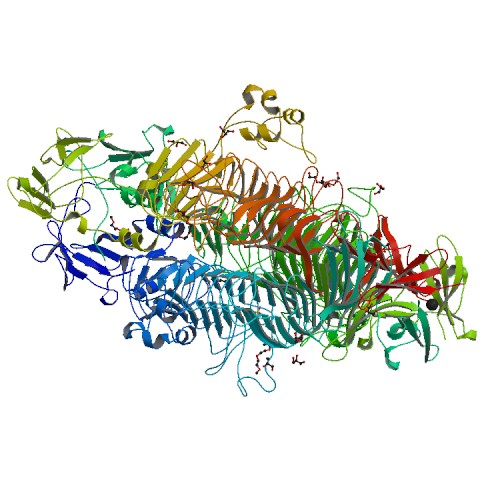
- PDB rendering based on 2XC1.

Identifiers
- Organism: Enterobacteria phage P22
- Symbol: 9
- Entrez: 1262799
- PDB: 2XC1
- RefSeq (mRNA): NC_002371.2
- RefSeq (Prot): NP_059644.1

Other data
- EC number: 3.2.1.-
- Chromosome: Genome: 0.02 - 0.02 Mb

The tailspike protein (P22TSP) of Enterobacteria phage P22 mediates the recognition and adhesion between the bacteriophage and the surface of Salmonella enterica cells. It is anchored within the viral coat and recognizes the O-antigen portion of the lipopolysaccharide (LPS) on the outer-membrane of Gram-negative bacteria. It possesses endoglycanase activity, serving to shorten the length of the O-antigen during infection.

== History ==
The initial interest in tailspike proteins was in the study of the effect the mutations on protein folding. Some mutations affect the folding efficiency of the protein but have no effect on the final native structure. Other mutations have been identified that lead to a temperature sensitive phenotype. Reconstitution experiments have demonstrated that the in vitro folding process closely mirrors the in vivo folding pathway. It has been further been demonstrated that folding yields in vitro decrease strongly with increasing temperature.

== Function ==
=== O-antigen binding ===
P22TSP recognizes the O-antigen polysaccharide of LPS serotypes A, B, or D1. The serotypes correspond to species S. Typhimurium, S. Enteritidis, and S. Paratyphi A. These carbohydrates share the same main chain trisaccharide repeating unit alpha-D-mannose-(1—4)-alpha-L-rhamnose-(1—3)-alpha-D-galactose-(1—2), but each have a different 2,6-dideoxyhexose substituent at C-3 of the mannose.

In vivo, P22TSP binds as a homotrimer and one phage particle can carry up to 6 tailspikes. P22TSP can bind multivalently, leading to an essentially irreversible attachment. It was shown that a minimum of two repeating units or an octasaccharide is required for binding. The TSP is also capable of binding longer fragments with similar affinity.

=== Endoglycosidase activity ===
P22TSP has endorhamnosidase activity and cleaves the glycosidic bond of the rhamnose group, producing an octasaccharide product. Two aspartic acids and one glutamic acid in the active site have been strongly linked to enzymatic activity. Different biological functions for this cleavage have been proposed. Cleavage could facilitate access to the membrane. or allow the phage to find the optimal position for infection.

=== Role in DNA injection ===
It has been demonstrated that cleavage of the O-antigen is necessary for DNA ejection by the phage. It has been proposed that P22TSP binding positions the phage to inject its DNA.

== Structure ==
P22TSP is a homotrimeric structural protein consisting of 666 amino acids. It is noncovalently bound to the neck of the viral capsid. It has been crystallized in space group P213 and has one monomer in the asymmetric unit. The secondary structure of P22TSP is dominated by a parallel Beta helix comprising 13 complete turns. This structure is further characterized as a beta-solenoid domain.

P22TSP is compOsed of two domains, each with distinct function. An N-terminal domains serves to bind to the phage particle and a C-terminal domains that interacts with the Salmonella surface. These two domains are connected by a flexible linker.

The binding site of P22TSP is located in the central part of the Beta helix. A deep cleft is formed by a 60-residue insertion on one side along with three smaller 5-25 residue insertions on the other.

== Homologous proteins ==
Several functional homologues of P22TSP has been identified belonging to the bacteriophages HK620 and Sf6. Both of these tailspike proteins also contain right-handed parallel beta-helices and share similar O-antigen binding and cleavage to P22TSP. These proteins share 70% sequence identity in their N-terminal domains, but no sequence similarities have been found in the C-terminal domains.

== Translational applications ==
=== Carbohydrate binding scaffolds ===
P22TSP has also been studied due to its high kinetic stability. As it exists and functions in the extracellular environment, it must endure harsh conditions such as highly variable temperatures or high concentrations of protein degrading enzymes. The kinetic stability of P22TSP derives from its compact beta-solenoid architecture. It was shown that like other viral fibrous proteins, P22 tailspike protein possesses a high stability against denaturation. This makes P22TSP a promising candidate for use as thermostable scaffold capable of being tailor-made to recognize heteropolymers.

=== Therapy against Salmonella infection ===
Tailspike proteins have also shown potential for more translational applications such as fighting bacterial infections. A study has demonstrated that orally administered P22TSP markedly reduced Salmonella colonization in a group of chickens. They suggest that the endorhamnosidase activity of the free tailspike molecule serves to modify O-antigen, compromising the LPS structure and thereby preventing the binding of a phage P22-attached tailspike protein. The authors suggest that this has the potential to be a novel therapy meant to fight bacterial infections.
