= Pectate lyase =

pectate lyase

Identifiers
- EC no.: 4.2.2.2
- CAS no.: 9015-75-2

Databases
- BRENDA: enzyme data
- ExPASy: NiceZyme view
- KEGG: enzyme entry
- MetaCyc: metabolic pathway
- Rhea: reactions
- PDB structures: RCSB PDB PDBe PDBsum
- Gene Ontology: AmiGO / QuickGO
Search
- PMC: articles
- PubMed: articles
- NCBI: proteins

Pectate lyase/Amb allergen

Identifiers
- Symbol: Amb_allergen
- Pfam: PF00544
- Pfam clan: CL0268
- InterPro: IPR002022
- SMART: SM00656
- Membranome: 596
Available protein structures:
- PDB: IPR002022 PF00544 (ECOD; PDBsum)
- AlphaFold: IPR002022; PF00544

Cartoon representation of the molecular structure of protein

Pectate lyase (EC 4.2.2.2) is an enzyme involved in the maceration and soft rotting of plant tissue. Pectate lyase is responsible for the eliminative cleavage of pectate, yielding oligosaccharides with 4-deoxy-α-D-mann-4-enuronosyl groups at their non-reducing ends. The protein is maximally expressed late in pollen development. It has been suggested that the pollen expression of pectate lyase genes might relate to a requirement for pectin degradation during pollen tube growth.

This enzyme catalyzes the chemical reaction

Eliminative cleavage of (1→4)-α-D-galacturonan to give oligosaccharides with 4-deoxy-α-D-galact-4-enuronosyl groups at their non-reducing ends

The structure and the folding kinetics of one member of this family, pectate lyase C (pelC)1 from Erwinia chrysanthemi has been investigated in some detail,. PelC contains a parallel beta-helix folding motif. The majority of the regular secondary structure is composed of parallel beta-sheets (about 30%). The individual strands of the sheets are connected by unordered loops of varying length. The backbone is then formed by a large helix composed of beta-sheets. There are two disulphide bonds in PelC and 12 proline residues. One of these prolines, Pro^{220}, is involved in a cis peptide bond. The folding mechanism of PelC involves two slow phases that have been attributed to proline isomerization.

Some of the proteins in this family are allergens. Allergies are hypersensitivity reactions of the immune system to specific substances called allergens (such as pollen, synthetic materials, dust, stings, drugs, or food) that, in most people, result in no symptoms. A nomenclature system has been established for antigens (allergens) that cause IgE-mediated atopic allergies in humans. This nomenclature system is defined by a designation that is composed of the first three letters of the genus; a space; the first letter of the species name; a space and an Arabic number. In the event that two species names have identical designations, they are discriminated from one another by adding one or more letters (as necessary) to each species designation.

The allergens in this family include allergens with the following designations: Amb a 1, Amb a 2, Amb a 3, Cha o 1, Cup a 1, Cry j 1, Jun a 1.

Two of the major allergens in the pollen of short ragweed (Ambrosia artemisiifolia) are Amb a I and Amb a II. The primary structure of Amb a II has been deduced and has been shown to share ~65% sequence identity with the Amb a I multigene family of allergens. Members of the Amb a I/a II family include Tobacco (Nicotiana tabacum, Common tobacco) pectate lyase, which is similar to the deduced amino acid sequences of two pollen-specific pectate lyase genes identified in Lycopersicon esculentum (Tomato); Cry j I, a major allergenic glycoprotein of Cryptomeria japonica (Japanese cedar)—the most common pollen allergen in Japan; and P56 and P59, which share sequence similarity with pectate lyases of plant pathogenic bacteria.

This enzyme belongs to the family of lyases, specifically those carbon-oxygen lyases acting on polysaccharides. The systematic name of this enzyme class is (1->4)-alpha-D-galacturonan lyase. Other names in common use include polygalacturonic transeliminase, pectic acid transeliminase, polygalacturonate lyase, endopectin methyltranseliminase, pectate transeliminase, endogalacturonate transeliminase, pectic acid lyase, pectic lyase, alpha-1,4-D-endopolygalacturonic acid lyase, PGA lyase, PPase-N, endo-alpha-1,4-polygalacturonic acid lyase, polygalacturonic acid lyase, pectin trans-eliminase, and polygalacturonic acid trans-eliminase. This enzyme participates in pentose and glucuronate interconversions.
