= Francisco J. Blanco =

Spanish chemist

Francisco José Blanco Gutiérrez is a Spanish chemist whose research applies nuclear magnetic resonance to structural biology. He works at the Center for Biological Research of the Spanish National Research Council (CIB-CSIC), in Madrid, Spain, where he leads the Biomolecular NMR group.

Blanco has a 1992 Ph.D. from the Complutense University of Madrid. As a doctoral student he worked for the Institute of the Structure of Matter of the Spanish National Research Council (IEM-CSIC). He was a postdoctoral researcher at the European Molecular Biology Laboratory. From 2000 to 2002 he worked for CSIC again, before taking a position at the Spanish National Cancer Research Center (CNIO). He became IKERBASQUE Research Professor at the Center for Cooperative Research in Biosciences (CIC bioGUNE) in 2007, and took his present position at CIB-CSIC in 2020. He also holds an honorary professorship at the Autonomous University of Madrid.
