= Beta-propeller =

Motif in protein architecture

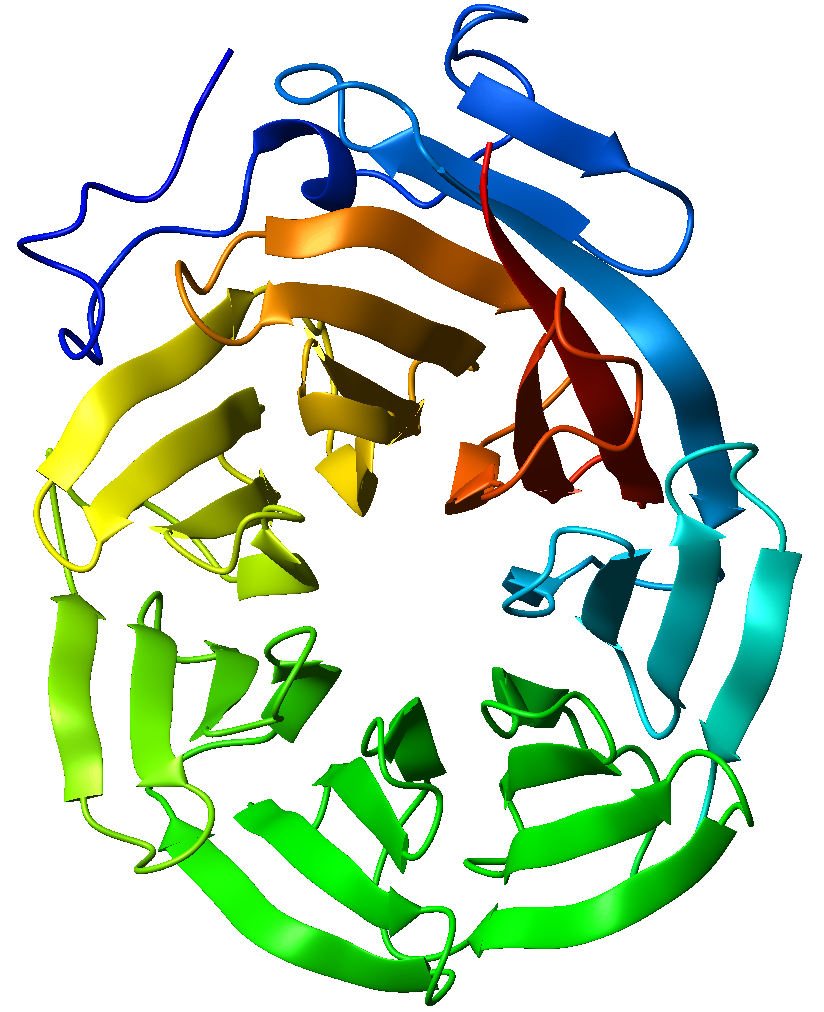
Ribbon diagram of the C-terminal WD40 domain of Tup1 (a transcriptional co-repressor in yeast), which adopts a 7-bladed beta-propeller fold. Ribbon is colored from blue (N-terminus) to red (C-terminus). PDB 1erj

In structural biology, a beta-propeller (β-propeller) is a type of all-β protein architecture characterized by 4 to 8 highly symmetrical blade-shaped beta sheets arranged toroidally around a central axis. Together the beta-sheets form a funnel-like active site.

== Structure ==
Each beta-sheet typically has four anti-parallel β-strands arranged in the beta-zigzag motif. The strands are twisted so that the first and fourth strands are almost perpendicular to each other. There are five classes of beta-propellers, each arrangement being a highly symmetrical structure with 4–8 beta sheets, all of which generally form a central tunnel that yields pseudo-symmetric axes.

While the protein's official active site for ligand-binding is formed at one end of the central tunnel by loops between individual beta-strands, protein-protein interactions can occur at multiple areas around the domain. Depending on the packing and tilt of the beta-sheets and beta-strands, the beta-propeller may have a central pocket in place of a tunnel.

The beta-propeller structure is stabilized mainly through hydrophobic interactions of the beta-sheets, while additional stability may come from hydrogen bonds formed between the beta-sheets of the C- and N-terminal ends. In effect this closes the circle which can occur even more strongly in 4-bladed proteins via a disulfide bond. The chaperones Hsp70 and CCT have been shown to sequentially bind nascent beta-propellers as they emerge from the ribosome. These chaperones prevent non-native inter-blade interactions from forming until the entire beta-propeller is synthesized. Many beta-propellers are dependent on CCT for expression. In at least one case, ions have been shown to increase stability by binding deep in the central tunnel of the beta-propeller.

Murzin proposed a geometric model to describe the structural principles of the beta propeller. According to this model the seven bladed propeller was the most favored arrangement in geometric terms.

Despite its highly conserved nature, beta-propellers are well known for their plasticity. Beyond having a variety of allowed beta-sheets per domain, it can also accommodate other domains into its beta-sheets. Additionally, there are proteins that have shown variance in the number of beta-strands per beta-sheet. Rather than having the typical four beta-strands in a sheet, beta-lactamase inhibitor protein-II only has three beta-strands per sheet while the phytase of Bacillus subtilis has five beta-strands per beta-sheet.

== Function ==
Due to its structure and plasticity, protein-protein interactions can form with the top, bottom, central channel, and side faces of the beta-propeller. The function of the propeller can vary based on the blade number. Four-bladed beta-propellers function mainly as transport proteins, and because of its structure, they have a conformation that is favorable for substrate binding. Unlike larger beta-propellers, four-bladed beta-propellers usually cannot perform catalysis themselves, but act instead to aid in catalysis by performing the aforementioned functions. Five-bladed propellers can act as transferases, hydrolases, and sugar binding proteins. Six- and seven-bladed propellers perform a much broader variety of functions in comparison to four- and five-bladed propellers. These functions can include acting as ligand-binding proteins, hydrolases, lyases, isomerases, signaling proteins, structural proteins, and oxidoreductases.

Variations in the larger (five- to eight-bladed) beta-propellers can allow for even more specific functions. This is the case with the C-terminal region of GyrA which expresses a positively charged surface ideal for binding DNA. Two alpha-helices coming out of the six-bladed beta-propeller of serum paraoxonase may provide a hydrophobic region ideal for anchoring membranes. DNA damage-binding protein 1 has three beta-propellers, in which the connection between two of the propellers is inserted into the third propeller potentially allowing for its unique function.

== Clinical Significance ==
- Beta-propeller protein-associated neurodegeneration (BPAN) is a condition characterized by early onset seizures, developmental delays, and intellectual disability. With aging, muscle and cognitive degeneration may also occur. Variants of the WDR45 gene have been identified in both males and females with this condition.
- Familial hypercholesterolemia is a human genetic disease caused by mutations to the gene that encodes low density lipoprotein receptor (LDLR), a protein which has at least one beta-propeller. This disease causes increased concentrations of low-density lipoprotein (LDL) and cholesterol which can lead to further consequences such as coronary atherosclerosis. Confirmed mutations have been shown to interfere with hydrogen bonding between blades of the beta-propeller.
- The beta-propeller has been used in protein engineering in several cases. Yoshida et al., for example, worked with glucose dehydrogenase (GDH), having a six-blade beta-propeller, to make an enzyme ideal for use as a glucose sensor. They succeeded in engineering a GDH chimera which had a higher thermostability, higher co-factor binding stability, and increased substrate specificity. These properties were attributed to increased hydrophobic interactions due to mutations at the C-terminus of the beta-propeller.
- The beta-propeller domain of the influenza virus neuraminidase are often used for drug design. Through study of this enzyme, researchers have developed influenza neuraminidase inhibitors which effectively block the influenza neuraminidase and consequently slowing or stopping the progression of the influenza infection.

== Examples ==
- The influenza virus protein viral neuraminidase is a six-bladed beta-propeller protein whose active form is a tetramer. It is one of two proteins present in the viral envelope and catalyzes the cleavage of sialic acid moieties from cell-membrane proteins to aid in the targeting of newly produced virions to previously uninfected cells.
- WD40 repeats, also known as beta-transducin repeats, are short fragments found primarily in eukaryotes. They usually form beta-propellers with 7–8 blades, but have also been shown to form structural domains with 4 to 16 repeated units critical for protein–protein interactions. WD40 protein motifs are involved in a variety of functions including signal transduction, transcription regulation, and regulation of the cell cycle. They also work as sites for protein-protein interactions, and can even play a role in the assembly of protein complexes. Specificity of these structural domains are determined by the sequence of the protein outside of itself.
- A beta-propeller is a critical component of LDLR and aids in a pH based conformational change. At neutral pH the LDLR is in an extended linear conformation and can bind ligands (PCSK9). At acidic pH the linear conformation changes to a hairpin structure such that ligand binding sites bind to the beta-propeller, preventing ligand binding.
- Beta-propeller phytases consist of a six-bladed β-propeller structure. Phytases are phosphatases that can hydrolyze the ester bonds of phytate, the major form of phosphate storage in plants. Through this process, phosphate that is normally inaccessible to livestock becomes available. Most livestock feed has added inorganic phosphate, which when excreted, can cause environmental pollution. The addition of phytase instead of phosphate into livestock feed would allow for animals to break down the phosphate already available in the plant matter. This would theoretically produce less pollution as less of the excess phosphate would be excreted.

=== Domains ===
Repeat domains known to fold into a beta-propeller include WD40, YWTD, Kelch, YVTN, RIVW (PD40), and many more. Their sequences tend to group together, suggesting a close evolutionary link. They are also related to many beta-containing domains.
