= Phytic acid =

- Structural formula of phytic acid

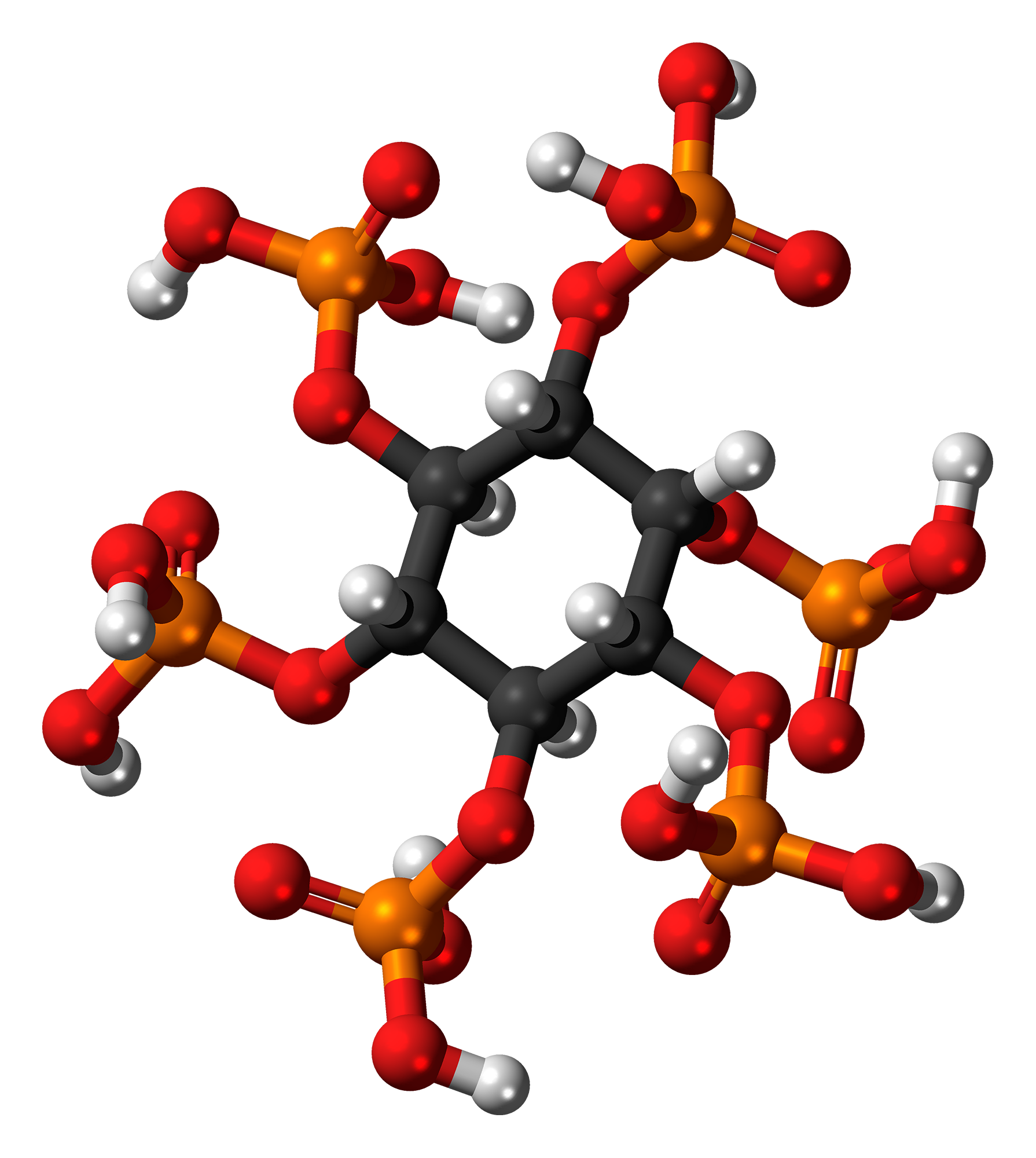
- Ball-and-stick model of phytic acid Carbon, C Hydrogen, H Oxygen, O Phosphorus, P

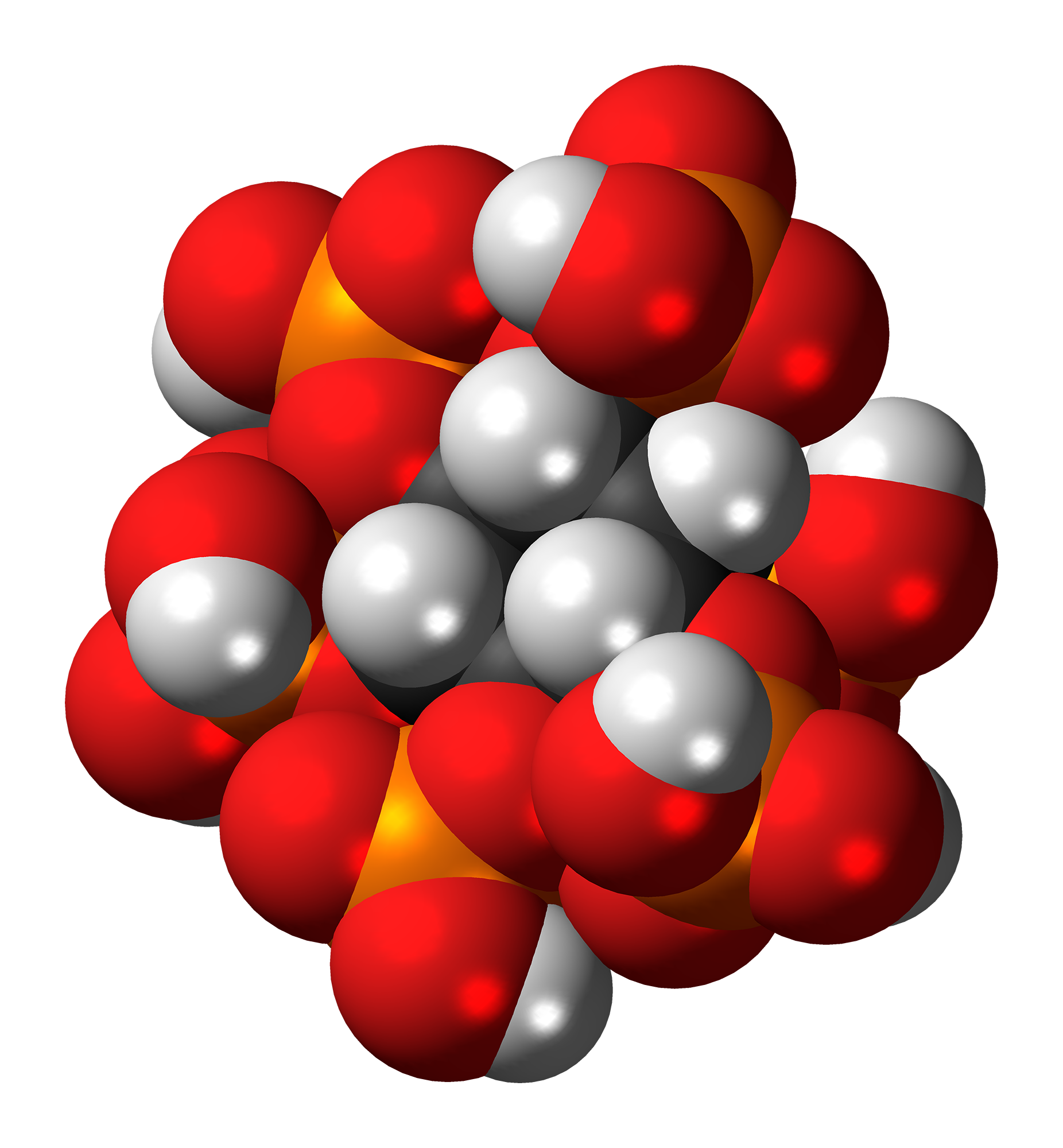
- Space-filling model of phytic acid

Names
- IUPAC name (1R,2S,3r,4R,5S,6s)-cyclohexane-1,2,3,4,5,6-hexayl hexakis[dihydrogen (phosphate)]

Identifiers
CAS Number	83-86-3
3D model (JSmol)	Interactive image
ChEBI	CHEBI:17401
ChemSpider	16735966
ECHA InfoCard	100.001.369
E number	E391 (antioxidants, ...)
PubChem CID	890
UNII	7IGF0S7R8I
CompTox Dashboard (EPA)	DTXSID40889331
- InChI: InChI=1S/C6H18O24P6/c7-31(8,9)25-1-2(26-32(10,11)12)4(28-34(16,17)18)6(30-36(22,23)24)5(29-35(19,20)21)3(1)27-33(13,14)15/h1-6H,(H2,7,8,9)(H2,10,11,12)(H2,13,14,15)(H2,16,17,18)(H2,19,20,21)(H2,22,23,24)/t1-,2-,3-,4+,5-,6- Key: IMQLKJBTEOYOSI-GPIVLXJGSA-N; InChI=1/C6H18O24P6/c7-31(8,9)25-1-2(26-32(10,11)12)4(28-34(16,17)18)6(30-36(22,23)24)5(29-35(19,20)21)3(1)27-33(13,14)15/h1-6H,(H2,7,8,9)(H2,10,11,12)(H2,13,14,15)(H2,16,17,18)(H2,19,20,21)(H2,22,23,24)/t1-,2-,3-,4+,5-,6- Key: IMQLKJBTEOYOSI-GPIVLXJGBP
- SMILES: [C@@H]1([C@@H]([C@@H]([C@@H]([C@H]([C@@H]1OP(=O)(O)O)OP(=O)(O)O)OP(=O)(O)O)OP(=O)(O)O)OP(=O)(O)O)OP(=O)(O)O

Properties
Chemical formula	C_{6}H_{18}O_{24}P_{6}
Molar mass	660.029 g·mol^{−1}
- Except where otherwise noted, data are given for materials in their standard state (at 25 °C [77 °F], 100 kPa). verify (what is ?) Infobox references

Phytic acid is a six-fold dihydrogenphosphate ester of inositol (specifically, of the myo isomer), also called inositol hexaphosphate, inositol hexakisphosphate (IP6) or inositol polyphosphate. At physiological pH, the phosphates are partially ionized, resulting in the phytate anion.

The (myo) phytate anion is a colorless species that has significant nutritional role as the principal storage form of phosphorus in many plant tissues, especially bran and seeds. It is also present in many legumes, cereals, and grains. Phytic acid and phytate have a strong binding affinity to the dietary minerals calcium, iron, and zinc, inhibiting their absorption in the small intestine.

The lower inositol polyphosphates are inositol esters with less than six phosphates, such as inositol penta- (IP5), tetra- (IP4), and triphosphate (IP3). These occur in nature as catabolites of phytic acid.

== Significance in agriculture ==
The hexavalent phytate anion.

Phytic acid was first identified as a substance by Pfeffer in 1872. In 1903, Posternak called it “la phytine”. The term "phytase" was first used in 1907 by Umetaro Suzuki.

Generally, phosphorus and inositol in phytate form are not bioavailable to non-ruminant animals because these animals lack the enzyme phytase required to hydrolyze the inositol-phosphate linkages. Ruminants are able to digest phytate because of the phytase produced by rumen microorganisms.

In most commercial agriculture, non-ruminant livestock, such as swine, fowl, and fish, are fed mainly grains, such as maize, legumes, and soybeans. Because phytate from these grains and beans is unavailable for absorption, the unabsorbed phytate passes through the gastrointestinal tract, elevating the amount of phosphorus in the manure. Excess phosphorus excretion can lead to environmental problems, such as eutrophication. The use of sprouted grains may reduce the quantity of phytic acids in feed, with no significant reduction of nutritional value.

Additionally, viable low-phytic acid mutant lines have been developed in several crop species in which the seeds have drastically reduced levels of phytic acid and concomitant increases in inorganic phosphorus. However, germination problems have reportedly hindered the use of these cultivars thus far. This may be due to phytic acid's critical role in both phosphorus and metal ion storage. Phytate variants also have the potential to be used in soil remediation, to immobilize uranium, nickel, and other inorganic contaminants.

== Biological effects ==
=== Plants ===
Although indigestible for many animals as they occur in seeds and grains, phytic acid and its metabolites have several important roles for the seedling plant.

Most notably, phytic acid functions as a phosphorus store, as an energy store, as a source of cations and as a source of myo-inositol (a cell wall precursor). Phytic acid is the principal storage form of phosphorus in plant seeds.

=== Animals ===
In animal cells, myo-inositol polyphosphates are ubiquitous, and phytic acid (myo-inositol hexakisphosphate) is the most abundant, with its concentration ranging from 10 to 100 μM in mammalian cells, depending on cell type and developmental stage. Being not directly absorbed in the gut, phytic acid is not obtained from the animal diet, but must be synthesized inside the cell from phosphate and inositol (which in turn is produced from glucose, usually in the kidneys).

==== In vitro ====
The interaction of intracellular phytic acid with specific intracellular proteins has been investigated in vitro, and these interactions have been found to result in the inhibition or potentiation of the activities of those proteins.

Inositol hexaphosphate facilitates the formation of the six-helix bundle and assembly of the immature HIV-1 Gag lattice. IP6 makes ionic contacts with two rings of lysine residues at the centre of the Gag hexamer. Proteolytic cleavage then unmasks an alternative binding site, where IP6 interaction promotes the assembly of the mature capsid lattice. These studies identify IP6 as a naturally occurring small molecule that promotes both assembly and maturation of HIV-1.

== Food science ==
Phytic acid, mostly as phytate in the form of phytin (i.e. the calcium/magnesium salts of phytate), is found within the hulls and kernels of seeds, including nuts, grains, and pulses.

In-home food preparation techniques may break down the phytic acid in all of these foods. Simply cooking the food will reduce the phytic acid to some degree. More effective methods are soaking in an acid medium, sprouting, and lactic acid fermentation such as in sourdough and pickling.

No detectable phytate (less than 0.02% of wet weight) was observed in vegetables such as scallion and cabbage leaves or in fruits such as apples, oranges, bananas, or pears.

As a food additive, phytic acid is used as a preservative. Phytic acid's E number is E391. It is allowed as a food additive in the US (GRAS), the EU, Japan, and China. It offers some antioxidant activity by binding away iron, and is especially effective in meat. It also inhibits polyphenol oxidase, the enzyme responsible for apple and banana browning. Basic research also suggests that it may deter the growth of pathogenic bacteria and spoilage mold.

Dry food sources of phytic acid
Food	Proportion by weight (g/1000 g)	
Food	Min.	Max.
Hulled Hemp Seed	4.5	4.5
Pumpkin seed	4.3	4.3
Linseed	2.15	2.78
Sesame seeds flour	5.36	5.36
Chia seeds	0.96	1.16
Almonds	1.35	3.22
Brazil nuts	1.97	6.34
Coconut	0.36	0.36
Hazelnut	0.65	0.65
Peanut	0.95	1.76
Walnut	0.98	0.98
Maize (corn)	0.75	2.22
Oat	0.42	1.16
Oat meal	0.89	2.40
Brown rice	0.84	0.99
Polished rice	0.14	0.60
Wheat	0.39	1.35
Wheat flour	0.25	1.37
Wheat germ	0.08	1.14
Whole wheat bread	0.43	1.05
Beans, pinto	2.38	2.38
Buckwheat	1.00	1.00
Chickpeas	0.56	0.56
Lentils	0.44	0.50
Soybeans	1.00	2.22
Tofu	1.46	2.90
Soy beverage	1.24	1.24
Soy protein concentrate	1.24	2.17
New potato	0.18	0.34
Spinach	0.22	NR
Avocado fruit	0.51	0.51
Chestnuts	0.47	
Sunflower seeds	1.60	

Fresh food sources of phytic acid
Food	Proportion by weight (%)	
Food	Min.	Max.
Taro	0.143	0.195
Cassava	0.114	0.152

=== Dietary mineral absorption ===
Phytic acid has a strong affinity to the dietary trace elements such as calcium, iron, and zinc, inhibiting their absorption by the small intestine, so it is considered an antinutrient. Other phytochemicals such as tannins similarly bind dietary metals. When iron and zinc bind to phytic acid, they form insoluble precipitates and are far less absorbable in the intestines. Similarly, absorption of calcium is impaired with the result that diets high in phytates but low in calcium can result in rickets.

Because phytic acid inhibits the absorption of iron, "dephytinization should be considered as a major strategy to improve iron nutrition during the weaning period". Dephytinization by exogenous phytase to phytate-containing food is an approach being investigated to improve nutritional health in populations that are vulnerable to mineral deficiency due to their reliance on phytate-laden food staples. Crop breeding to increase mineral density (biofortification) or reducing phytate content are under preliminary research.

== Proposed applications ==
=== Fire retarding agent ===
Phytic acid derivatives have been studied as means to enhance the fire retardancy of composite materials and organic polymers such as PLA.

=== Dentistry ===
Phytic acid has potential use in endodontics, preventive, and regenerative dentistry, and in improving the characteristics of dental materials.
