= ST turn =

The ST turn is a structural feature in proteins and polypeptides. Each consists of three amino acid residues (labeled i, i + 1 and i + 2) in which residue i is a serine (S) or threonine (T) that forms a hydrogen bond from its sidechain oxygen group to the mainchain NH group of residue i + 2.

ST turn, a three amino acid residue motif with an N-terminal serine. The hydrogen bond between the serine side chain and the mainchain of the residue two ahead is shown as a dotted grey line. Carbons grey, oxygens red and nitrogens blue. The side chains of the second and third residues are omitted, as are the mainchain CO of the third residue and all hydrogens.

Similar motifs occur with aspartate or asparagine as residue i, called asx turn. Four types of asx turn and ST turn can be distinguished: types I, I’, II and II’. These categories correspond (via sidechain-mainchain mimicry of residue i) to those of the more abundant hydrogen-bonded beta turns, which have four residues and a hydrogen bond between the CO of residue i and the NH of residue i + 3. Regarding their occurrence in proteins, they differ in that type I is the commonest of the four beta turns while type II’ is the commonest of the ST and asx turns.

Asx and ST turns both occur frequently at the N-termini of α-helices, as part of asx motifs or ST motifs, with the asx, serine or threonine as the N cap residue. They are thus often regarded as helix capping features.

Evidence for a functionally relevant ST turn is provided in the CDR3 region of the T-cell receptor (B chain, V domain).

A proportion of ST turns are accompanied by a mainchain-mainchain hydrogen bond that qualifies them as ST motifs.
