= Beta-keto L-gulonate decarboxylase =

Protein-coding gene in the species Homo sapiens

Identifiers
- Aliases: BKGD, chromosome 11 open reading frame 54
- External IDs: OMIM: 615810; MGI: 1918234; GeneCards: BKGD
Available structures
PDB	Ortholog search: PDBe RCSB
PDB	List of PDB id codes 1XCR
Enzyme activity
EC #	BRENDA	ExPASy	KEGG	MetaCyc
4.1.1.34	↗	↗	↗	↗

Gene location (Human)
Chr.	Chromosome 11 (human)
Band	11q21	Start	93,741,591 bp
Band	11q21	End	93,764,749 bp

Gene location (Mouse)
Chr.	Chromosome 9 (mouse)
Band	9|9 A2	Start	15,194,633 bp
Band	9|9 A2	End	15,217,744 bp
RNA expression pattern
Bgee	Human / Mouse (ortholog); Top expressed in: renal medulla; human kidney; mucosa of ileum; jejunal mucosa; liver; mucosa of paranasal sinus; pancreatic epithelial cell; Skeletal muscle tissue of biceps brachii; metanephros; retinal pigment epithelium / Top expressed in: parotid gland; brown adipose tissue; left lobe of liver; human kidney; transitional epithelium of urinary bladder; olfactory epithelium; jejunum; tunica adventitia of aorta; left colon; duodenum; More reference expression data
BioGPS	n/a
Gene ontology
Molecular function	zinc ion binding; protein binding; hydrolase activity; hydrolase activity, acting on ester bonds; metal ion binding
Cellular component	extracellular exosome; nucleus; nucleoplasm; nuclear body
Biological process	metabolism
Sources:Amigo / QuickGO
Orthologs
Databases	NCBI: entry; OMA: entry
Species	Human	Mouse
Entrez	28970	70984
Ensembl	ENSG00000182919	ENSMUSG00000031938
UniProt	Q9H0W9	Q91V76
RefSeq (mRNA)	NM_001286067; NM_001286068; NM_001286069; NM_001286070; NM_001286071 NM_014039; NM_001351985; NM_001351986; NM_001351988; NM_001351989; NM_001351990; NM_001351991; NM_001351992; NM_001351993; NM_001351987; NM_001369406	NM_001199484; NM_001199485; NM_133732; NM_001359258
RefSeq (protein)	NP_001272996; NP_001272997; NP_001272998; NP_001272999; NP_001273000 NP_054758; NP_001338914; NP_001338915; NP_001338916; NP_001338917; NP_001338918; NP_001338919; NP_001338920; NP_001338921; NP_001338922; NP_001356335	NP_001186413; NP_001186414; NP_598493; NP_001346187
Location (UCSC)	Chr 11: 93.74 – 93.76 Mb	Chr 9: 15.19 – 15.22 Mb
PubMed search
- Wikidata
View/Edit Human	View/Edit Mouse

Beta-keto L-gulonate decarboxylase is a protein that in humans is encoded by the gene BKGD (previously C11orf54). BKGD exhibits hydrolase activity on p-nitrophenyl acetate and acts on ester bonds, though the overall function is still not fully understood by the scientific community. The protein is highly conserved with the most distant homolog found is in bacteria.

== Gene ==
BKGD is located on chromosome 11 at 11q21. The gene consists of 13 exons and spans 23730 bp. BKGD is flanked by TAF1D and MED17.

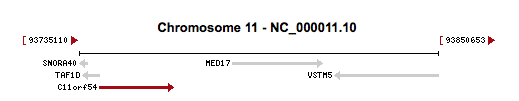

== mRNA ==
The protein ester hydrolase BKGD exists as a monomer and is composed of 315 amino acids. There are 6 isoforms for BKGD. See table 1.

-
Variant	Isoform	Length (bp)	Accession number
1	ester hydrolase C11orf54 isoform a	2726	NM_001286067.1
2	ester hydrolase C11orf54 isoform a	2589	NM_001286068.1
3	ester hydrolase C11orf54 isoform a	2594	NM_001286069.1
4	ester hydrolase C11orf54 isoform b	2444	NM_014039.3
5	ester hydrolase C11orf54 isoform c	2442	NM_001286070.1
6	ester hydrolase C11orf54 isoform d	2417	NM_001286071.1

The amino acid sequence contains the domain of unknown function 1907. Found in this transcript is the HxHxxxxxxxxxH motif which coordinates the zinc ion involved in the hydrolase activity. An LR nest motif is found at lys262 and Arg263. The LR nest motif forms hydrogen bonds between the NH groups and anions; an acetate anion is coordinated with the LR nest.

== Protein ==
=== Primary sequence ===
Table 2 shows the different characteristics of the protein sequence throughout humans and other orthologs.

Organism	Molecular Weight (kilodalton)	Isoelectric point	High Bias Amino Acids	Repeats
Human	35.1	5.9	F	AEFS
Mouse	35.0	5.9	H	None
13 Lined Ground Squirrel	35.1	6.0	F,H	PAEF
Giant Panda	35.2	6.5	F	PAEF

=== Secondary structure ===
The protein of C11orf54 exists as a monomer in solution. The protein assumes a globular shape of 20 beta strands and 4 alpha helices, containing 9 antiparallel beta strands forming a beta screw region. The β-screw region of C11orf54 has structural similarity to the cyclic adenosine 3′,5′-monophosphate (cAMP) binding domain of the regulatory subunit of protein kinase A. A zinc ion is bound to the HxHxxxxxxxxxH motif found in the sequence.

=== Subcellular localization ===
C11orf54 is predicted to be localized 60.9% in the cytoplasm, 21.7% in the nucleus, 13.0% mitochondrial and 4.3% in the Golgi Apparatus.

=== Expression & post translational modifications ===
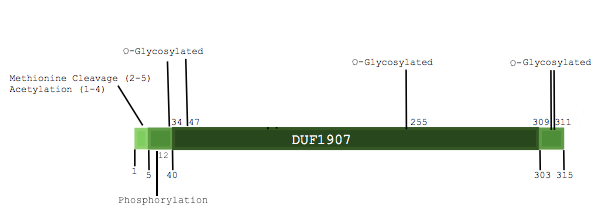
Image 1: Post-Transcriptional Modifications to C11orf54 protein

See image one. The protein is highly expressed in the kidneys and moderately expressed in the adrenal gland, colon, liver, testis and thyroid gland.

== Homology ==
=== Paralogs ===
There are no paralogs for C11orf54.

=== Orthologs ===
The protein Ester Hydrolase C11orf54 has many orthologs (see table.) It is highly conserved (60-100% identity) in mammals, reptiles, birds, and fish. The protein is moderately conserved (30-59.99% identity) in invertebrates, amphibia, Cnidaria, Mollusca, fungi and bacteria. It is not conserved in archaea. The most distant orthologs are bacteria. Figure 2 shows the unrooted phylogenetic tree of a few of C11orf54's orthologs.

Species	Common name	Class	Accession number	Percent identity	Divergence (MYA median)
Microtus ochrogaster	Prairie Vole	mammalia	XP_005346877.1	87.0	88
Chelonia mydas	Green Sea Turtle	reptilia	XP_007069537.1	72.8	320
Xenopus tropicalis	Burmese Python	reptilia	XP_007434894.1	70.9	320
Python bivittatus	Red Junglefowl	Ave	NP_001264206.1	73.4	320
Gallus gallus	Common Cuckoo	Ave	XP_009564677.1	72.5	320
Cuculus canorus	Southern Platyfish	Actinopterygii	XP_005800827.1	65.2	432
Xiphophorus maculatus	Zebrafish	Actinopterygii	NP_997781.1	62.4	432
Danio rerio	Acorn Worm	Enteropneusta	XP_002738479.1	55.6	627
Saccoglossus kowalevskii	Atlantic Horseshoe Crab	Merostomata	XP_013785734.1	56.6	758
Limulus polyphemus	Western Clawed Frog	Amphibia	XP_012812415.1	55.1	353
Crassostrea gigas	Pacific Oyster	Bivalvia	XP_011412414.1	50.0	758
Tribolium castaneum	Red Flour Beetle	Insecta	XP_968861.1	49.0	758
Drosophila bipectinata	Fruitfly	Insecta	XP_017103988.1	46.0	758
Megachile rotundata	Alfalfa leafcutter bee	Insecta	XP_003702672.1	44.8	758
Zymoseptoria brevis	fungi	Dothideomycetes	KJX93246.1	36.5	1150
Cladophialophora carrionii	fungi	Dothideomycetes	OCT48531.1	35.8	1150
Alternaria alternata	fungi	Dothideomycetes	XP_018384285.1	36.2	1150
Candidatus Pelagibacter ubique	bacteria	Bacteria	WP_075504325.1	34.5	4090
Pelagibacteraceae bacterium	bacteria	Bacteria	OCW82973.1	34.1	4090

== Function ==
C11orf54's coordination with a zinc ion through three histidines and an acetate anion is likely to point to a function of the protein being an enzymatic reaction as an ester hydrolase. The protein has a low turnover number when reacted with p-nitrophenyl acetate (0.042 sec−1) as compared to a 1 sec−1 turnover rate found in another enzyme (bovine carbonic anhydrase II) that reacts with p-nitrophenyl acetate.

Recent research has identified C11orf54 as the missing β-keto-L-gulonate decarboxylase in the pentose pathway. The study employing gene coevolution analysis and metabolic network mapping demonstrated that C11orf54 catalyzes the decarboxylation of 3-dehydro-L-gulonate, linking it to sugar metabolism in humans and other metazoans

=== Interacting proteins ===
Protein Name	Abbreviation
Ubiquitin C	UBC
Collagen, type IV, alpha 3	COL4A3
Thyroid Hormone Receptor Interactor 13	TRIP13
DEAD (Asp-Glu-Ala-Asp) box polypeptide 60-like	DDX60L
Glutamine-fructose-6-phosphate transaminase 2	GFPT2
Superkiller viralicidic activity 2-like (S. cerevisiae)	SKIV2L
OTU domain, ubiquitin aldehyde binding 1	OTUB1
