= CV Whitney Cup =

The C.V. Whitney Cup is one of the most prestigious high-goal polo tournaments in the United States and the world. Organized by the United States Polo Association (USPA), it traditionally inaugurates the American Triple Crown season, currently known as The Gauntlet of Polo, played in Wellington, Florida.

== History ==
The tournament was originally established in 1979 under the name "U.S. Handicap" and debuted at the Retama Polo Center in San Antonio, Texas. In 1988, the tournament was renamed in honor of Cornelius Vanderbilt "Sonny" Whitney, a pivotal figure in the development of polo in the United States, a three-time winner of the U.S. Open Polo Championship, and a member of the Museum of Polo and Hall of Fame.

The competition was created to serve as the premier high-level preparatory tournament before the USPA Gold Cup and the U.S. Open Polo Championship.

== Level of competition ==
The Cup is played at a demanding 22-goal handicap level, which historically guarantees the participation of the best players and sports organizations in the international circuit. As an example of the elite level that characterizes the competition, the 2009 edition featured the following prominent teams and players:

Participating Teams (2009 Edition)
Team	Player 1	Player 2	Player 3	Player 4
Audi	Facundo Pieres	Gonzalo Pieres	Frederick Mannix	Marc Ganzi
Las Monjitas	Eduardo Novillo Astrada	Ignacio Novillo Astrada	Adam Snow	Camilo Bautista
Pony Express	Matias Magrini	David Stirling	Nicolas Roldan	Bob Daniels
Lechuza Caracas	Juan Martin Nero	Guillermo Caset	Nicolas Español	Victor Vargas
White Birch	Mariano Aguerre	Francisco Bensadon	Jeff Blake	Peter Brant
Zacara	Cristian Laprida	Carlos Gracida	Jeff Hall	Lyndon Lea
Orchard Hill	Pablo Mac Donough	Lucas Criado	Hector Galindo	Steve Van Andel

== Partial champions roster ==
Throughout its history, the tournament has been conquered by some of the most important polo organizations in the world. The following are the champion teams in notable editions, according to official USPA and press records:

Year	Champion Team	Ref.
1979	Tulsa	
1980	Tulsa	
1988	Ft. Lauderdale	
1989	Ft. Lauderdale	
1995	White Birch	
1996	White Birch	
1999	Lechuza Caracas	
2000	White Birch	
2001	White Birch	
2002	Lechuza Caracas	
2005	White Birch	
2007	Lechuza Caracas	
2011	Lechuza Caracas	
2012	Valiente	
2014	Valiente	
2017	Valiente	
2018	Valiente	
2019	Pilot	
2021	Park Place	
2022	Park Place	
2023	Valiente	
2024	Valiente	
2025	La Dolfina	
2026	The Dutta Corp	

== See also ==
- U.S. Open Polo Championship
- USPA Gold Cup
- Argentine Open Polo Championship
- Santa María Polo Club
