= Zinc L-aspartate =

Zinc l-aspartate
- Zinc aspartate

Names
- IUPAC name Zinc (2S)-2-amino-4-hydroxy-4-oxobutanoate
- Other names Zinc aspartate

Identifiers
CAS Number	36393-20-1
3D model (JSmol)	Interactive image
ChemSpider	140862
PubChem CID	160266
UNII	4OC7QTI23H
- InChI: InChI=1S/2C4H7NO4.Zn/c2*5-2(4(8)9)1-3(6)7;/h2*2H,1,5H2,(H,6,7)(H,8,9);/q;;+2/p-2/t2*2-;/m10./s1 Key: POEVDIARYKIEGF-FMHLBKHZSA-L; InChI=1/2C4H7NO4.Zn/c2*5-2(4(8)9)1-3(6)7;/h2*2H,1,5H2,(H,6,7)(H,8,9);/q;;+2/p-2/t2*2-;/m10./s1 Key: POEVDIARYKIEGF-XYBLZSPWBS
- SMILES: [Zn+2].[O-]C(=O)[C@@H](N)CC(=O)O.[O-]C(=O)[C@H](N)CC(=O)O

Properties
Chemical formula	C_{8}H_{12}N_{2}O_{8}Zn
Molar mass	329.59848 g/mol
Appearance	White crystalline powder
Density	Solid

Hazards
Safety data sheet (SDS)	MSDS
- Except where otherwise noted, data are given for materials in their standard state (at 25 °C [77 °F], 100 kPa). verify (what is ?) Infobox references

Zinc l-aspartate, often simply called zinc aspartate, is a chelated zinc supplement. Zinc aspartate is a salt of zinc with the amino acid aspartic acid.

== Chemical properties ==
Zinc aspartate is a white crystalline powder. It is soluble in dilute hydrochloric acid and insoluble in water.

== Bioavailability ==
There are no specific bioavailability studies that were made available on this dietary mineral. It is assumed that the reported solubility of zinc aspartate in diluted hydrochloric acid will allow its dissociation and absorption in the stomach. However, it was not clear if further absorption could take place in the intestine considering its reported insolubility in water.

== Hazards ==
Potential acute health effects may include skin and eye irritation. If inhaled, it can cause lung irritation.

== See also ==
- Compounds of zinc
- Magnesium aspartate
- Potassium aspartate
