= ST motif =

The ST motif is a commonly occurring feature in proteins and polypeptides. It consists of four or five amino acid residues with either serine or threonine as the first residue (residue i). It is defined by two internal hydrogen bonds. One is between the side chain oxygen of residue i and the main chain NH of residue i + 2 or i + 3; the other is between the main chain oxygen of residue i and the main chain NH of residue i + 3 or i + 4. Two websites are available for finding and examining ST motifs in proteins, Motivated Proteins: and PDBeMotif.

ST motif. A pentapeptide with an N-terminal serine forming two hydrogen bonds with the main chain atoms of succeeding residues. Carbons grey, oxygens red and nitrogens blue. Hydrogen atoms omitted. The main chain - main chain hydrogen bond is in red and the side chain - main chain hydrogen bond (which also forms an ST turn) is dotted grey.

When one of the hydrogen bonds is between the main chain oxygen of residue i and the side chain NH of residue i + 3 the motif incorporates a beta turn. When one of the hydrogen bonds is between the side chain oxygen of residue i and the main chain NH of residue i + 2 the motif incorporates an ST turn.

As with ST turns, a significant proportion of ST motifs occur at the N-terminus of an alpha helix with the serine or threonine as the N cap residue. They have thus often been described as helix capping features.

A related motif is the asx motif which has aspartate or asparagine as the first residue.

Two well conserved threonines at α-helical N-termini occur as ST motifs and form part of the characteristic nucleotide binding sites of SF1 and SF2 type DNA and RNA helicases.

It has been suggested that the sequences SPXX or STXX are frequently found at DNA-binding sites and also that they are recognized as substrates by some protein kinases. Structural studies of polypeptides indicate that such tetrapeptides can adopt the hydrogen bonding pattern of the ST motif.
