= Potassium asparaginate =

Chemical compound

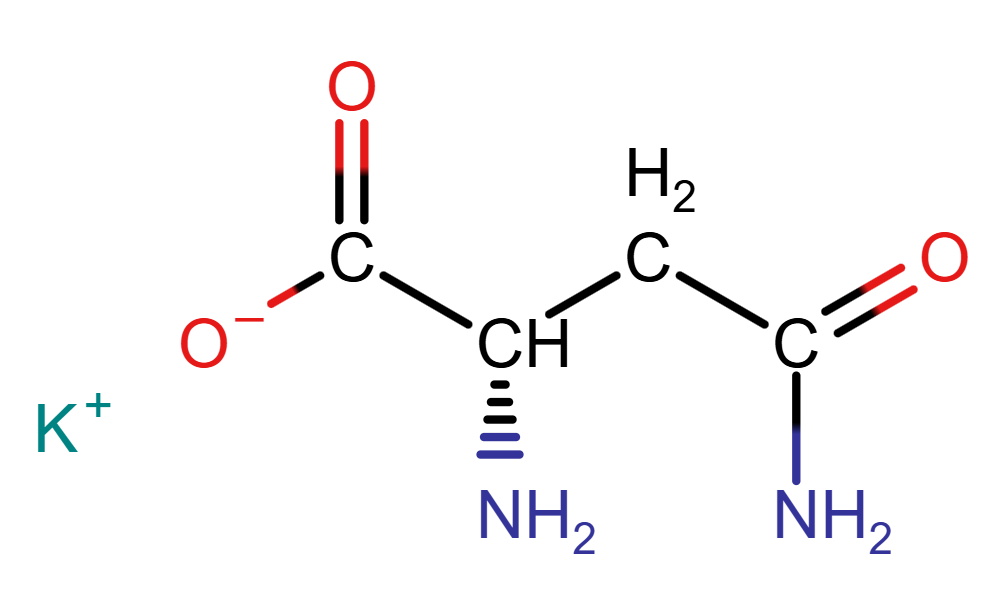

Names
- IUPAC name L-Asparagine potassium salt
- Other names L-Asparagine, potassium salt (1:1); L-Asparagine, monopotassium salt; Asparagine potassium

Identifiers
CAS Number	37707-20-3
3D model (JSmol)	Interactive image
ChemSpider	32700657
PubChem CID	23688210
UNII	P1CVX5FD7Y
CompTox Dashboard (EPA)	DTXSID00191144
- InChI: InChI=1S/C4H8N2O3.K/c5-2(4(8)9)1-3(6)7;/h2H,1,5H2,(H2,6,7)(H,8,9);/q;+1/p-1/t2-;/m0./s1 Key: NRFNNNBFDIFBLS-DKWTVANSSA-M
- SMILES: [K+].N[C@@H](CC(N)=O)C([O-])=O

Properties
Chemical formula	C_{4}H_{7}KN_{2}O_{3}
Molar mass	170.209 g·mol^{−1}
Solubility in water	16 g/100ml (30 °C); 22 g/100ml (35 °C); 28 g/100ml (40 °C)
- Except where otherwise noted, data are given for materials in their standard state (at 25 °C [77 °F], 100 kPa). Infobox references

Potassium asparaginate is a potassium salt of the L-asparagine amino acid.

Potassium asparaginate can be considered both a salt and a coordination complex. As a salt, potassium asparaginate is formed when the potassium ion (K^{+}) replaces the hydrogen ion (H^{+}) in the carboxyl group (-COOH) of L-asparagine, an amino acid. As a coordination complex, in the context of coordination chemistry, the potassium ion coordinates with the L-asparagine, forming a stable structure where the central metal ion is surrounded by and associated with the L-asparagine, a ligand (complexing molecule), through coordinate covalent bonds.

== Chemical properties ==
The composition by mass of elemental potassium (K) in potassium asparaginate (C_{4}H_{7}KN_{2}O_{3}) is approximately 23 percent, given that the molar mass of a potassium atom (K) is 39.1 grams per mole (g/mol) and the molar mass of potassium asparaginate is 170.21 g/mol (39.1/170.21 is approximately 23 percent).

The solubility of potassium asparaginate, in g/100ml of water, ethanol and methanol, at 30, 35 and 40 degrees Celsius, is the following:

Solubility of Potassium Asparaginate (g/100ml)
Liquid	30 °C	35 °C	40 °C
Water	16	22	28
Ethanol	12	16	20
Methanol	11	15	19

== Synthesis ==
Potassium asparaginate can be obtained from L-asparagine and potassium fluoride (KF) in a chemical reaction which yields potassium asparaginate and hydrofluoric acid (HF).

== Applications ==
=== Medicine ===
Potassium asparaginate, along with magnesium asparaginate, is marketed in Russia and Eastern European countries to treat or prevent potassium deficiency (hypokalemia) and magnesium deficiency (hypomagnesemia). Potassium asparaginate and magnesium asparaginate purportedly improve metabolism in the myocardium (heart muscle), enhance the tolerance of cardiac glycosides (heart medications) and exhibit antiarrhythmic activity (help regulate heart rhythm). These health claims are not backed by reliable studies. In the United States, potassium asparaginate is not specifically approved by the Food and Drug Administration (FDA) for treating any medical condition; to treat hypokalemia, potassium is instead administered as other salts, namely gluconate, citrate, chloride or bicarbonate.

=== Nonlinear optics ===
In nonlinear optics, crystals of potassium asparaginate are investigated as a potential nonlinear optical material, as salts of some amino acids possess strong nonlinear optical properties. A nonlinear optics material is a substance with high optical nonlinearity. Such substances are useful in applications such as signal transmission, data storage and optical switching. High optical nonlinearity refers to the property of materials to respond to light, such as a laser, in a nonlinear manner, meaning that the property does not scale linearly with the intensity of the light applied.

== See also ==
- Potassium aspartate
- Magnesium aspartate
- Magnesium asparaginate
