= Biodyl =

Biodyl is a trademark of Merial for a dietary supplement used in animals. It is manufactured in two formulations: a powder for use in an individual animal's drinking water, and an injectable solution. The injectable solution is available by veterinary prescription in some countries and over the counter in others.

== Physical and chemical properties ==
Biodyl is formulated as a powder to be given in water, and as an injectable solution. The injectable solution is given under the skin, in the muscle, or in a vein, depending on the species of animal. Its intended uses include reducing physiological stress such as due to being transported, and preventing azoturia in performance animals. The manufacturer's own product information describes Biodyl as an "injection solution containing metabolic constituents (adenosine triphosphoric acid or ATP, magnesium aspartate, potassium aspartate, sodium selenite and vitamin B 12) for debility, convalescence and myopathies."

Composition:

- Selenium (as sodium selenite)
- Potassium aspartate (hemihydrate)
- Magnesium aspartate (tetrahydrate)
- Methyl parahydroxybenzoate
- Propyl parahydroxybenzoate
- Excipient

== Legal status ==
In the United States, Biodyl is not FDA approved, "in that there is not in effect an approval of an application filed with respect to its intended use or uses".

== Adverse effects ==
The manufacturer however, states that "Biodyl is safe when used as directed. It has been around from the 1950s and adverse reactions have been exceedingly rare over many years of tracking. Less than one animal in over 2 million doses."

== Veterinary use ==
=== Implication in polo pony deaths ===
In April 2009, the sudden deaths of 21 polo ponies at Palm Beach International Polo Club in Florida were attributed by a polo team captain to error or tampering in the team's supply of Biodyl. A newspaper in Argentina reported 3 similar deaths of horses at an international competition in Uruguay.

In the United States, concerns about a possible manufacturing error or tampering were lost amid a media outcry about the "illegal" use of "illegal" drugs not approved by the FDA, even "banned" by the FDA. In the US, Biodyl is neither an illegal drug nor a banned drug, but it is an unapproved drug. Although Biodyl is a dietary supplement, a type of product that normally is not subject to FDA approval, FDA approval is required to market injectable solutions (except animal vaccines, which are subject to USDA approval). An Associated Press story misreported an October 2008 FDA refusal to permit commercial importation of the solution as a refusal to approve the solution. In fact, Biodyl is not FDA-approved because the manufacturer has never submitted an application for FDA approval. Also, the FDA may permit the importation of unapproved drugs for personal use for pets.

However, on April 23 a new concern emerged when a reputable pharmacy in Ocala, Florida disclosed that in compounding a preparation for the polo ponies which may have been intended to substitute for Biodyl, the pharmacy accidentally used an incorrect quantity of one of the ingredients. Compounding of drugs for use in animals is a subject of concern for the FDA.

== See also ==
- Adverse effect
- Intravenous therapy
- Electrolyte
- Oral rehydration therapy
- Polo pony
- Endurance riding
