= Nest (protein structural motif) =

The Nest is a type of protein structural motif. It is a small recurring anion-binding feature of both proteins and peptides. Each consists of the main chain atoms of three consecutive amino acid residues. The main chain NH groups bind the anions while the side chain atoms are often not involved. Proline residues lack NH groups so are rare in nests. About one in 12 of amino acid residues in proteins, on average, belongs to a nest.

RL nest bound to an egg oxygen. carbons grey, oxygens red and nitrogens blue. Hydrogen atoms omitted. Hydrogen bonds are grey dotted lines.

== Nest conformations ==
The conformation of a nest is such that the NH groups of the first and third amino acid residues are liable to be hydrogen bonded to a negatively charged, or partially negatively charged, atom, often an oxygen atom. The NH of the second residue may also be hydrogen bonded to the same atom but usually points somewhat away. These main chain atoms form a concavity called a nest into which an anionic atom fits. Such anionic atoms are sometimes called eggs and more than one egg may occur bound to a nest. The oxyanion hole of the intestinal serine proteases is a functional example of a nest. Another occurs at the bottom of a deep cavity in the antibiotic peptide vancomycin which binds a key carboxylate group utilized during the final stages of bacterial cell wall synthesis, thereby preventing bacterial cells from multiplying.

Nests are defined by the conformation of the main chain atoms, namely the phi, psi dihedral angles of the first two amino acids in the nest. For a typical (RL) nest phi_{i}=-90°; psi_{i}=0°; phi_{i+1}=80°; psi_{i+1}=20°.

Nests vary in their degree of concavity. A few have so little that the concavity is lost; these peptides often bind cations via their main chain CO groups, instead of anions via their NH groups. The specificity filter of the potassium channel and the water channel of aquaporin exhibit this more linear conformation in which carbonyl groups are employed by proteins to transport molecules across membranes. This near-linear conformation is also that found in a strand of alpha sheet

== Compound nests ==
If two nests overlap such that residue i+1 of the first nest is residue i of the second nest, a compound nest is formed. This has four NH groups instead of three. If three nests overlap such that residues i+1 and i+2 of the first nest are residue i of the second and third nest, a wider compound nest is formed with five NH groups, and so on. The main chain atoms form part of an incomplete ring with the NH groups all pointing roughly towards the centre of the ring. Because their concavities are often wider than simple nests, compound nests are commonly employed by proteins for binding multi-atom anions such as phosphates, as in the P-loop or Walker motifs, and in iron-sulphur clusters. The synthesized peptide Ser-Gly-Ala-Gly-Lys-Thr, designed as a minimal peptide P-loop, was shown to bind inorganic phosphate strongly at neutral pH.

== Types of nest ==
Simple nests are of two kinds called RL and LR depending on the sign of the phi angles of the first two nest residues. R residues have negative phi values (as in right-handed alpha-helices) and L residues have positive phi values (as in the left-handed alpha helix). Eighty percent of nests are RL and 20% are LR. When two nests overlap they may be RLR or LRL. When three nests overlap they may be RLRL or LRLR, and so on.

Every Schellman loop incorporates an RL nest in the last three of its six residues. The nest binds carbonyl oxygen atoms preceding it in sequence.

A number of antibody proteins have RLR nests within the hairpin loops of their H-chain CDRs (complementarity determining regions) bound to a carboxylate side chain. These have been engineered to give rise to monoclonal nest-containing antibodies specific for proteins with phosphorylated serines and threonines.

Most PDZ domains have an RL nest at the beginning of the first beta-strand, with the function of recognizing the carboxylate group at the C-terminus of the domain's peptide or protein ligand.
