= ASX (disambiguation) =

ASX is the Australian Securities Exchange.

ASX may also refer to:

== Transportation ==
- Armstrong Siddeley ASX, a jet engine
- Mitsubishi ASX, a sport utility vehicle
- Atlantic Spaceport Complex (ASX), St. Lawrence, Newfoundland Island, Newfoundland and Labrador, Canada
- John F. Kennedy Memorial Airport (IATA airport code ASX), Ashland, Wisconsin, USA

== Other uses ==
- ASE Group (NYSE stock symbol ASX), "Advanced Semiconductor Engineering"
- Muratayak language (ISO 639 language code asx), a language found in Papua New Guinea

== See also ==
- Asx motif, a commonly occurring feature in proteins and polypeptides
- Asx turn, a structural feature in proteins and polypeptides
- Asymptomatic
- AS-10
