= AS-10 =

AS10, AS-10, may refer to:

- AS-10 Karen (Russian: Х-25, romanized: Kh-25), a Soviet air-to-ground missile made by Zvezda-Strela
- Airspeed AS 10 Oxford, a twin-engine monoplane, a British aeroplane
- Argus As 10, a German V-8 aircraft engine
- Toyota Grand Highlander (AS10), a midsize crossover SUV
- USS Argonne (AS-10), a U.S. Navy cargo ship, a Design 1024 class ship

== See also ==
- ASX (disambiguation)
- AS (disambiguation)
