= C cap =

Amino acid

The term C cap (C-cap, Ccap) describes an amino acid in a particular position within a protein or polypeptide. The C cap residue of an alpha helix is the last amino acid residue at the C terminus of the helix. More precisely, it is defined as the last residue (i) whose NH group is hydrogen-bonded to the CO group of residue i-4 (or sometimes residue i-3). Because of this it is sometimes also described as the residue following the helix.

Certain motifs occur commonly at or around the C cap, notably the Schellman loop and the niche (protein structural motif).

The N cap is the corresponding amino acid residue at the other end of the helix
