= Victor Vargas =

Venezuelan banker and businessman (born 1952)

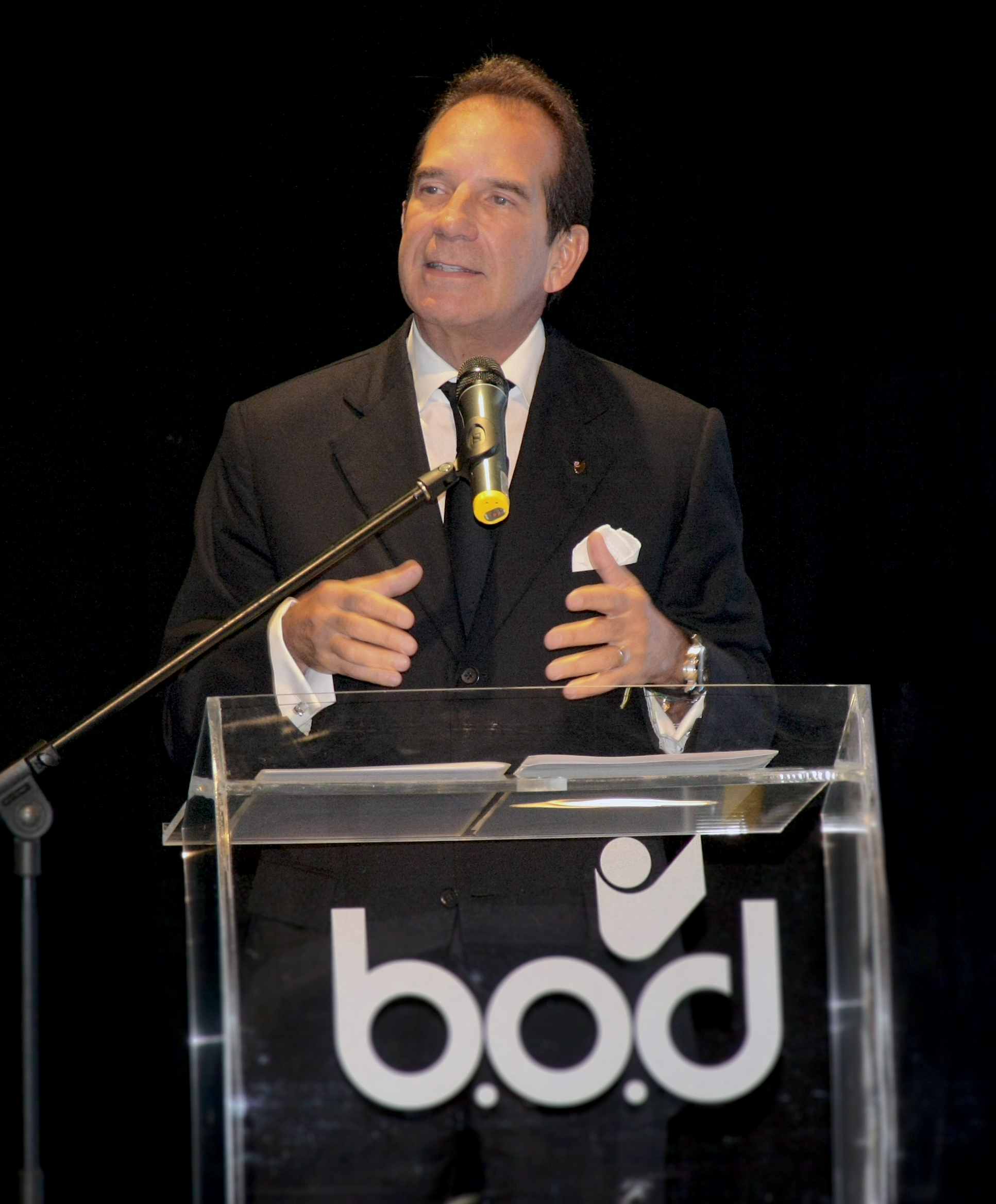
- Victor Vargas Irausquin, vice-president of Banco Occidental de Descuento (BOD)
- Born: Víctor José Vargas Irausquín; 28 March 1952 (age 74); Chacao, Caracas, Venezuela
- Education: Andrés Bello Catholic University
- Occupation: Banker
- Spouses: Carmen Leonor Santaella Tellería (m. 1976; div. 2013) María Beatriz Hernández Rodríguez (m. 2014)
- Children: 5, including Marie Marguerite, Duchess of Anjou
- Relatives: Prince Louis, Duke of Anjou (son-in-law)

Victor Vargas (born 28 March 1952) is a Venezuelan banker and businessman, best known for being the former owner and president of the 4th largest private bank in Venezuela, Banco Occidental de Descuento. The bank was recognized as the fourth largest private financial entity in Venezuela and was noted by reports for climbing the Forbes list of the world's most valuable companies. BOD was later integrated with another financial entity BNC.

== Early life ==
Victor Vargas was born into a middle class family in the municipality of Chacao, city of Caracas, Venezuela. His mother was the first woman to serve on the Supreme Court of Venezuela. His father was a doctor. He earned his law degree at Andrés Bello Catholic University.

== Career ==
Vargas started his career as a lawyer.

In the 1980s, he acquired CapitalBanc Corp., a New York-based bank. The bank was sold to Popular Bank of Puerto Rico down in the early 1990s after authorities discovered a fraud. While Vargas was not accused of fraud, authorities alleged that he misled regulators about when he discovered an illegal activity. He subsequently paid a $1.5 million fine and signed an order agreeing not to invest in U.S. banks again without regulatory permission. He is quoted describing the venture as "the worst business" of his life. He shared his experience in October 2007 when he moderated a panel on corporate governance at a Miami conference of the Florida International Bankers Association when he was the President of (FELABAN) Latin American Banks Federation.

In 1992 he sold a small bank he founded and owned. He used those funds a year later, in 1993, to buy Banco Occidental de Descuento, based in the oil-rich state of Zulia. Many of his clients are oil investors. Another form of revenue comes from purchasing sovereign debt bonds and re-selling them for profit to investors. As of 2015, it was the 4th largest private bank in Venezuela. He was its president.

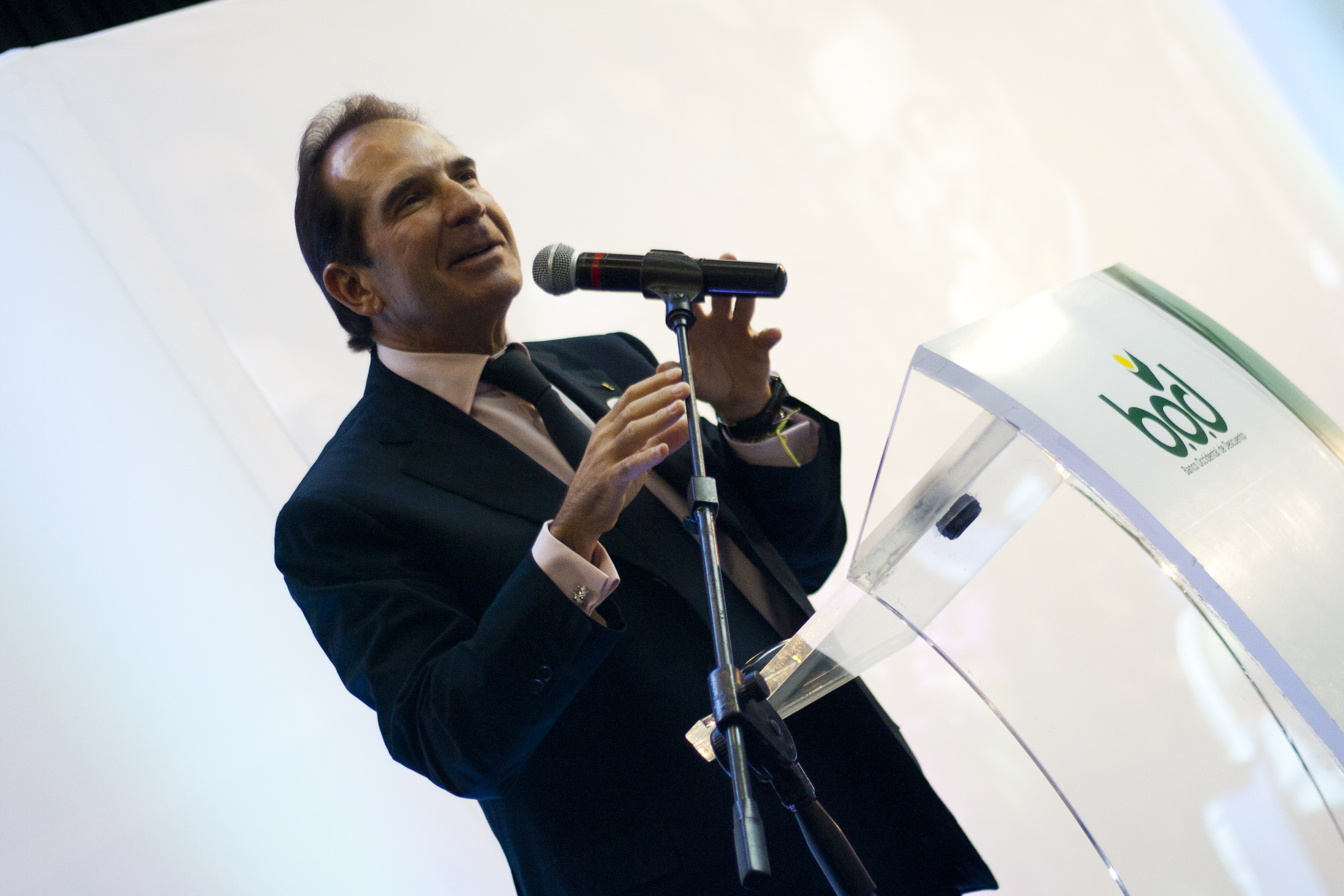
Victor Vargas presenting BOD's results and plans

=== Economic alliances ===
In 2017 Under Vargas's presidency, BOD reached an agreement with American Express to expand its point-of-sale network, providing over 45,000 new commercial outlets for American Express cardholders in Venezuela.

In 2014, Vargas and BOD partnered with American Express to provide a new credit product for microentrepreneurs. Microentrepreneurs provide for 15 percent of the Venezuelan economy.

Vargas and BOD's goal was to expand the American Express card to 300,000 cardholders with access to 46,000 businesses by 2013. The card would offer a 4-year rotating term financing option.

=== National and International financial leadership ===
In 2006 Vargas was the president of the Latin American Federation of Banks (FELABAN) in 2006, occupying the maximum representative role for the banking sector in Latin America.

In 2010, overall profitability on bank assets in Venezuela fell to 9.7 percent from 20.5 percent in 2009. Venezuelan bankers were concerned that the Venezuelan Central Bank had not changed commission tariffs in over five years. Vargas was the leader of the National Bank Board and led discussions with the Superintendencia de Bancos. Vargas proposed that the Central Bank create new requirements for giving loans to strategic sectors as opposed to the then-current law requiring compulsory loan portfolios.

=== Relations with Bolivarian government ===
Critics have alleged Vargas made background deals with the Chávez government, which Vargas has denied.

== BOD Financial Group ==
Vargas owns BOD Financial Group (Spanish: Grupo Financiero BOD), an umbrella company that owns Vargas's businesses. BOD Financial owns companies in three major market sectors: banking, capital markets, and insurance.

== Philanthropy and civic activities ==
In 2011, Vargas launched the Entrepreneur Program, a non-profit organization that helps people start small businesses. The program targets entrepreneurs who are not able to get funding from traditional banking sources. In its first phase in July 2011, the program selected and trained 100 entrepreneurs. The program provides funding for cultural and educational initiatives targeted at disadvantaged communities. Since 2002, the program has invested $20 million in these initiatives. For example, the program funded the National Youth Orchestra of Chacao, which is conducted by the famous maestro José Antonio Abreu.

As head of the Banking Association of Venezuela, Vargas helped initiate an energy-saving programmed called “Efficient Consumption.” The program calls for companies to install renewable energy technologies at their headquarters buildings. Vargas called on private banks to take charge on spreading the word of the program.

The Enclave Foundation runs a free "Music for All" program that teaches music to over 6,000 public school children. Music for All has run for over 20 years. Children in grades kindergarten through grade school can participate.

Help the Lake" provides resources to study and protect Lake Maracaibo.

== Awards ==
On June 23, 2015, Vargas was named "Latin America Entrepreneur of the Year" by business magazine The Executive. Concepción Dancausa, one of Spain's delegates to the European Union's Committee of the Regions, personally gave the award to Vargas at a ceremony in Madrid. According to Latin Business Daily, Vargas received the award "for his leadership role in driving economic growth, job creation, and expansion of wealth in Latin America."

== Polo ==
Vargas co-owns and plays left bench for Lechuza Caracas, a polo club and team.

On September 1, 2015, Vargas told The Telegraph that he was planning to start a league in the Dominican Republic. Vargas had moved the headquarters of his club from England to Spain. When asked why, he explained the decision was simple: the rain. "We've played for five weeks here in Spain and had no rain."

On June 21, 2009, twenty-one of his horses died suddenly during a polo tournament in Palm Beach, Florida. The Lechuza Caracas Argentine captain believed the cause to be tainted Biodyl, a vitamin supplement given to horses to ward off exhaustion, as five of the horses that did not receive it were unaffected. Lechuza Caracas was runner-up in the CV Whitney Cup and won the Cup in 2011.

== Personal life ==
He was married to Carmen Leonor Santaella Tellería, with whom he had two daughters and one son.

They divorced in 2014. Vargas remarried to María Beatriz Hernández later that year. They have two children.
