= Asx turn =

Feature in proteins and polypeptides

The Asx turn is a structural feature in proteins and polypeptides. It consists of three amino acid residues (labeled i, i+1 and i+2) in which residue i is an aspartate (Asp) or asparagine (Asn) that forms a hydrogen bond from its sidechain CO group to the mainchain NH group of residue i+2. About 14% of Asx residues present in proteins belong to Asx turns.

The name "Asx" is used here to represent either of the amino acids aspartate (Asp) or asparagine (Asn).

== Types ==
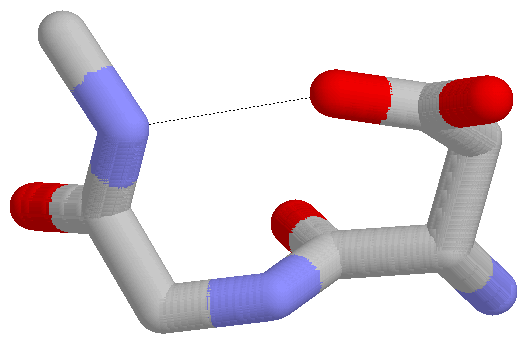
An Asx turn with an aspartate at residue i. One of the sidechain oxygens of the aspartate forms a hydrogen bond (dotted line) with the mainchain NH group of residue i+2. Colors: red, oxygen; grey, carbon; blue, nitrogen. Hydrogen atoms are omitted.

Four types of Asx turn can be distinguished: types I, I’, II and II’. These categories correspond to those of the better-known hydrogen-bonded beta turns, which have four residues and a hydrogen bond between the CO of residue i and the NH of residue i+3. Asx turns and beta turns have structurally similar hydrogen-bonded loops and exhibit sidechain-mainchain mimicry in the sense that the sidechain of residue i of the Asx turn mimics the mainchain of residue i of the beta turn. Regarding their occurrence in proteins, they differ in that type I is the commonest of the four beta turns while type II’ is the commonest of the Asx turns.

== Occurrence ==
Asx and ST turns both occur frequently at the N-termini of α-helices. as part of Asx motifs or ST motifs such that the Asx, serine or threonine is the N cap residue. They are thus often regarded as helix capping features.

== Related motifs ==
Similar motifs occur with serine or threonine as residue i, which are called ST turns. In spite of serine and threonine having one less sidechain atom, such that the sidechain-mainchain mimicry of β turns is imperfect, these features occur in proteins as the four types in numbers approaching those of Asx turns. They also exhibit a tendency to substitute each other over evolutionary time.

A proportion of Asx turns are accompanied by a mainchain–mainchain hydrogen bond that qualifies them as Asx motifs.
