= Schellman loop =

Protein structural motif

Schellman loop. Nitrogen atoms, blue; oxygens, red; carbons, grey. The purple and yellow lines are hydrogen bonds. Side chain and hydrogen atoms omitted. Hydrogen bond arrangement as in ii of the lower figure.

Schellman loops (also called Schellman motifs or paperclips) are commonly occurring structural features of proteins and polypeptides. Each has six amino acid residues (labelled residues i to i+5) with two specific inter-mainchain hydrogen bonds (as in lower figure, i) and a characteristic main chain dihedral angle conformation. The CO group of residue i is hydrogen-bonded to the NH of residue i+5 (colored orange in upper figure), and the CO group of residue i+1 is hydrogen-bonded to the NH of residue i+4 (beta turn, colored purple). Residues i+1, i+2, and i+3 have negative φ (phi) angle values and the phi value of residue i+4 is positive. Schellman loops incorporate a three amino acid residue RL nest (protein structural motif), in which three mainchain NH groups (from Schellman loop residues i+3 to i+5) form a concavity for hydrogen bonding to carbonyl oxygens. About 2.5% of amino acids in proteins belong to Schellman loops. Two websites are available for examining Schellman loops in proteins, Motivated Proteins: ; and ExploreTurns:

The majority of Schellman loops (82%) occur at the C-terminus of an alpha-helix such that residues i, i+1, i+2 and i+3 are part of the helix. Over a quarter of helices (28%) have a C-terminal Schellman loop.

Occasional Schellman loops occur with seven instead of six residues. In these, the CO group of residue i is hydrogen-bonded to the NH of residue i+6, and the CO group of residue i+1 is hydrogen-bonded to the NH of residue i+5. Rare “left-handed” six-residue Schellman loops occur; these have the same hydrogen bonds, but residues i+1, i+2, and i+3 have positive φ values while the φ value of residue i+4 is negative; the nest is of the LR, rather than the RL, kind.

In addition to the 7-residue "wide" Schellman loop, a five-residue "short" Schellman loop also occurs with low frequency. In this motif, the CO group of residue i is hydrogen-bonded to the NH group of residue i+4, while the CO group of residue i+1 is hydrogen-bonded to the NH group of residue i+3.

A rare "double" Schellman loop is also found. This nine-residue motif is formed of two overlapping Schellman motifs, with H-bonds linking residues (1,6), (2,5), (4,9), and (5,8) (see schematic in the ExploreTurns loop motif browser). The first Schellman motif is usually in a right-handed conformation, while the second is left-handed.

Schellman loops commonly include additional BB H-bonds.

Amino acid propensities for the residues of the common type of Schellman loop have been described. Residue i+4 is the one most-highly conserved; it has positive φ values; 70% of amino acids are glycine and none are proline.

Hydrogen bond arrangements of Schellman loops. Residues are represented by black filled circles. Mainchain-mainchain hydrogen bonds are shown as dashed lines. The grey shading indicates the three nest residues.

Consideration of the hydrogen bonding in the nests of Schellman loops bound to mainchain oxygens reveals two main types of arrangement: 1,3-bridged or not. In one (lower figure, ii) the first and third nest NH groups are bridged by an oxygen atom. In the other (lower figure, iv) the first NH group is hydrogen bonded to the CO group of an amino acid four residues behind in the sequence, and none of the nest NH groups are bridged. It seems that Schellman loops are less homogeneous than might have been expected.

The original Schellman criteria result in the inclusion of features not now regarded as Schellman loops. A newer set of criteria is given in the first paragraph.
