= USPA Gold Cup =

Tournament information
- Sport: Polo
- Location: Wellington, Florida, United States
- Established: 1974
- Format: High-goal (22-goal handicap)
- Most championships: White Birch (12 titles)
- Website: www.uspolo.org

Current champion
- Pilot (2026)

The USPA Gold Cup is one of the most prestigious high-goal polo tournaments in the world and the second major competition of the high-handicap season in the United States. Organized by the United States Polo Association (USPA), the tournament serves as the second leg of the American Triple Crown (currently known as The Gauntlet of Polo) and is played annually in Wellington, Florida.

== History ==
The tournament was officially established in 1974. In its formative years, the competition was held at the Oak Brook Polo Club in Illinois and later at the Milwaukee Polo Club, before eventually relocating to Florida, where it found its permanent home and cemented its status as a premier global equestrian event.

Played at the 22-goal handicap level, the Gold Cup serves as the competitive bridge between the C.V. Whitney Cup and the U.S. Open Polo Championship.

== Partial champions roster ==
Throughout its history, the Gold Cup has been claimed by top-tier sports organizations. White Birch currently holds the all-time record with 12 titles spanning three decades. The following table details champion teams in notable editions, highlighting the elite level of the competition, according to official USPA records and specialized press:

Year	Champion Team	Ref.
1974	Milwaukee	
1995	White Birch	
2007	Crab Orchard	
2009	Lechuza Caracas	
2011	Audi	
2012	Valiente	
2013	Valiente	
2014	Valiente	
2015	Audi	
2017	Valiente	
2018	Valiente	
2019	Pilot	
2021	Scone	
2022	Pilot	
2023	Scone	
2024	La Dolfina	
2025	Park Place	
2026	Pilot	

== See also ==
- C.V. Whitney Cup
- U.S. Open Polo Championship
- Argentine Open Polo Championship
