= Beta turn =

Protein structural motif

β turns (also β-bends, tight turns, reverse turns, Venkatachalam turns) are the most common form of turns—a type of non-regular secondary structure in proteins that cause a change in direction of the polypeptide chain. They are very common motifs in proteins and polypeptides. Each consists of four amino acid residues (labelled i, i+1, i+2 and i+3). They can be defined in two ways:

1. By the possession of an intra-main-chain hydrogen bond between the CO of residue i and the NH of residue i+3;
2. By having a distance of less than 7Å between the Cα atoms of residues i and i+3.

The hydrogen bond criterion is the one most appropriate for everyday use, partly because it gives rise to four distinct categories; the distance criterion gives rise to the same four categories but yields additional turn types.

== Definition ==
=== Hydrogen bond criterion ===
Two beta turns, type I above and type II below. Each image shows the main chain atoms of a tetrapeptide excluding hydrogen atoms. Carbon atoms grey, oxygen atoms red and nitrogen atoms blue. The defining hydrogen bond is shown as a magenta line.

The hydrogen bond criterion for beta turns, applied to polypeptides whose amino acids are linked by trans peptide bonds, gives rise to just four categories, as shown by Venkatachalam in 1968. They are called types I, II, I' and II'. All occur regularly in proteins and polypeptides but type I is most common, because it most resembles an alpha helix, occurring within 3_{10} helices and at the ends of some classic alpha helices. Type II beta turns, on the other hand, often occur in association with beta-sheet as part of beta-links.

The four types of beta turn are distinguished by the φ, ψ angles of residues i+1 and i+2 as shown in the table below giving the typical average values. Glycines are especially common as amino acids with positive φ angles; for prolines such a conformation is sterically impossible but they occur frequently at amino acid positions where φ is negative.

| | φ_{i+1} | ψ_{i+1} | φ_{i+2} | ψ_{i+2} |
|---|---|---|---|---|
| type I | -60 | -30 | -90 | 0 |
| type II | -60 | 120 | 80 | 0 |
| type I' | 60 | 30 | 90 | 0 |
| type II' | 60 | -120 | -80 | 0 |

Type I and II β turns exhibit a relationship to one another because they potentially interconvert by the process of peptide plane flipping (180° rotation of the CONH peptide plane with little positional alteration to side chains and surrounding peptides). The same relationship exists between type I' and II' β turns. Some evidence has indicated that these interconversions occur in beta turns in proteins such that crystal or NMR structures merely provide a snapshot of β turns that are, in reality, interchanging. In proteins in general all four beta turn types occur frequently but I is most common, followed by II, I' and II' in that order. Beta turns are especially common at the loop ends of beta hairpins; they have a different distribution of types from the others; type I' is the most common, followed by types II', I and II. Additional turn types have been defined by clustering turn conformations within very high-resolution protein structures.

Asx turns and ST turns resemble beta turns except that residue i is replaced by the side chain of an aspartate, asparagine, serine or threonine. The main chain–main chain hydrogen bond is replaced by a side chain–main chain hydrogen bond. 3D computer superimposition shows that, in proteins, they occur as one of the same four types that beta turns do, except that their relative frequency of occurrence differs: type II' is the most common, followed by types I, II and I'.

=== Distance criterion ===
Apart from the type I, I', II and II' beta turns as identified via the hydrogen bond criterion, non-hydrogen-bonded beta-turns named type VIII often occur. Three other, fairly rare, types of beta turn have been identified in which the peptide bond between residues i+1 and i+2 is cis rather than trans; these are named types VIa1, VIa2 and VIb. Another category, type IV, was used for turns not belonging to any of the above. Further details of these turns are given in turn (biochemistry).
