= Threonine (data page) =

Chemical data page

The complete data for Threonine
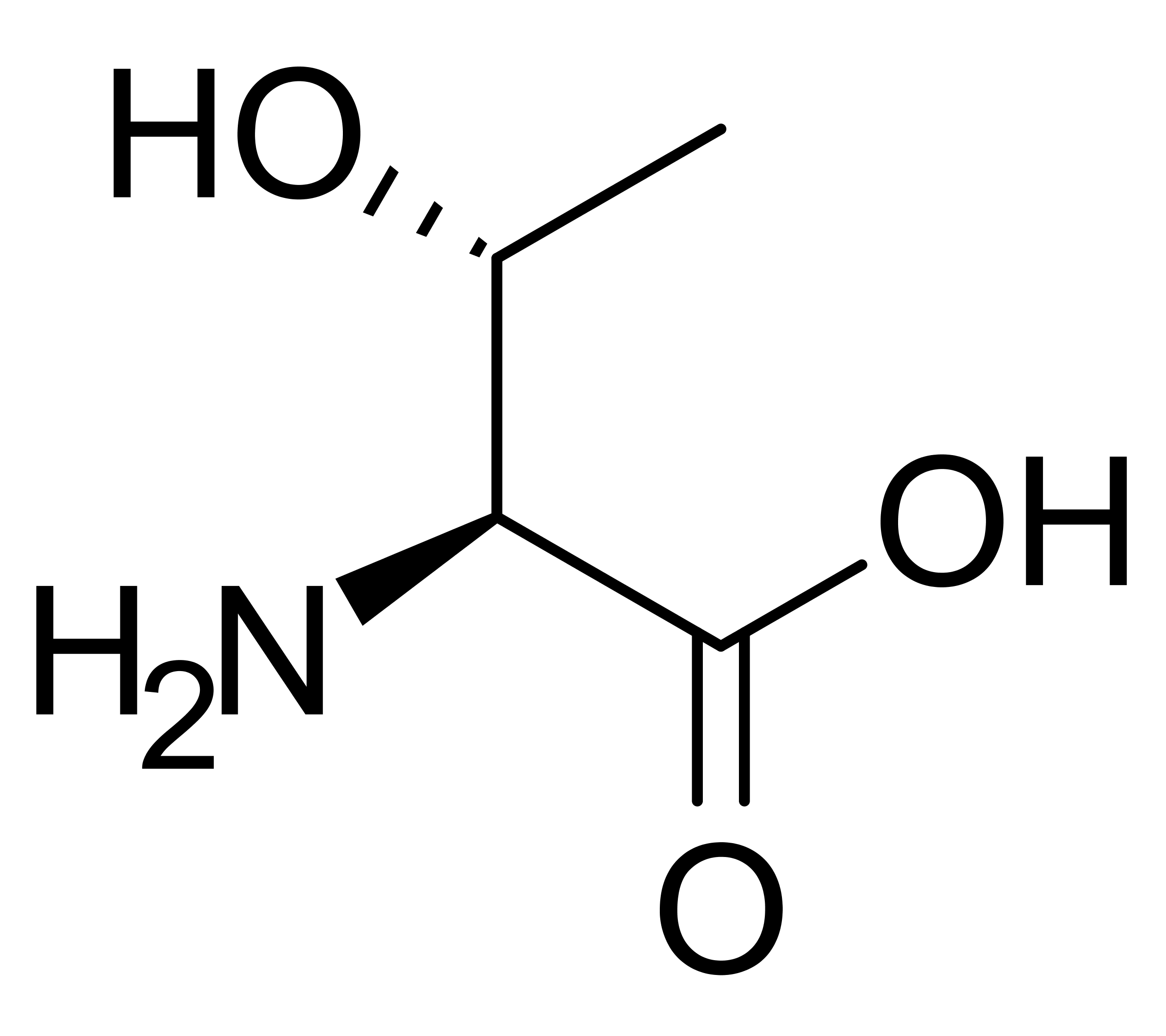
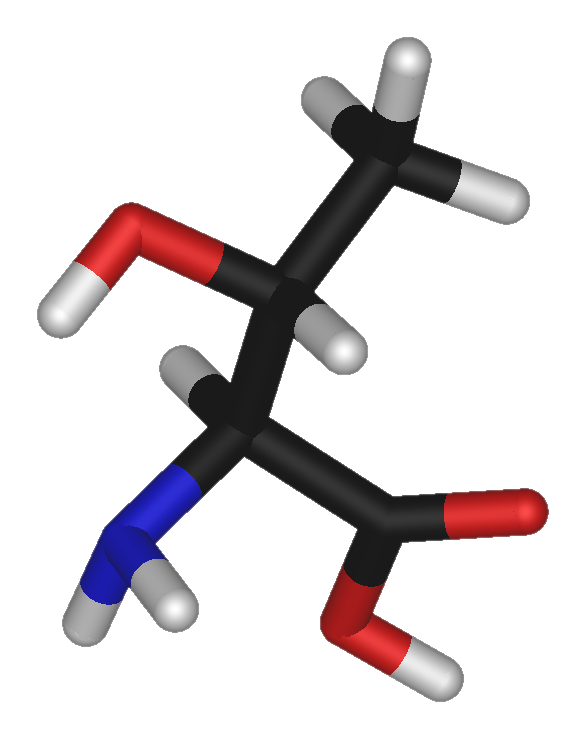
General information
Chemical formula: C_{4}H_{9}NO_{3}
Molar mass: 119.12 g·mol^{−1}
Systematic name:
(2S,3R)-2-Amino-3-hydroxybutanoic acid
Abbreviations: T, Thr
Synonyms:
none
Database data
SMILES: CC(O)C(N)C(=O)O
InChI=1/C4H9NO3/c1-2(6)3(5)4(7)8/h2-3,6H,5H2,1H3,(H,7,8)/t2-,3+/m1/s1/f/h7H

| ATC: N/A | CAS: 72-19-5 | DrugBank: N/A | EINECS: 200-774-1 ^{a} | PubChem: 69435 (D) ^{a}, 6288 (L) ^{a} |

Physical properties

| Structure | Crystal data | Spectral data: UV-Vis / IR / NMR / MS |

| Phase behavior | Solid properties T_{m}: 256 °C | Liquid properties | Gas properties |

Hazard properties

| MSDS N/A | Main hazards: N/A | NFPA 704 | Flash point: N/A | RTECS number: N/A |

Chemical properties

| XLogP: -3.036 | pI: 5.60 | pK_{a}: 2.20, 8.96 | Tautomers: | Hydrogen bond: donor - 3; acceptor - 4 |

Pharmacological properties

This box:
- Except where noted otherwise, data relate to Standard temperature and pressure.
- Reliability of data general note.
