= Asparagine (data page) =

Chemical data page

The complete data for Asparagine
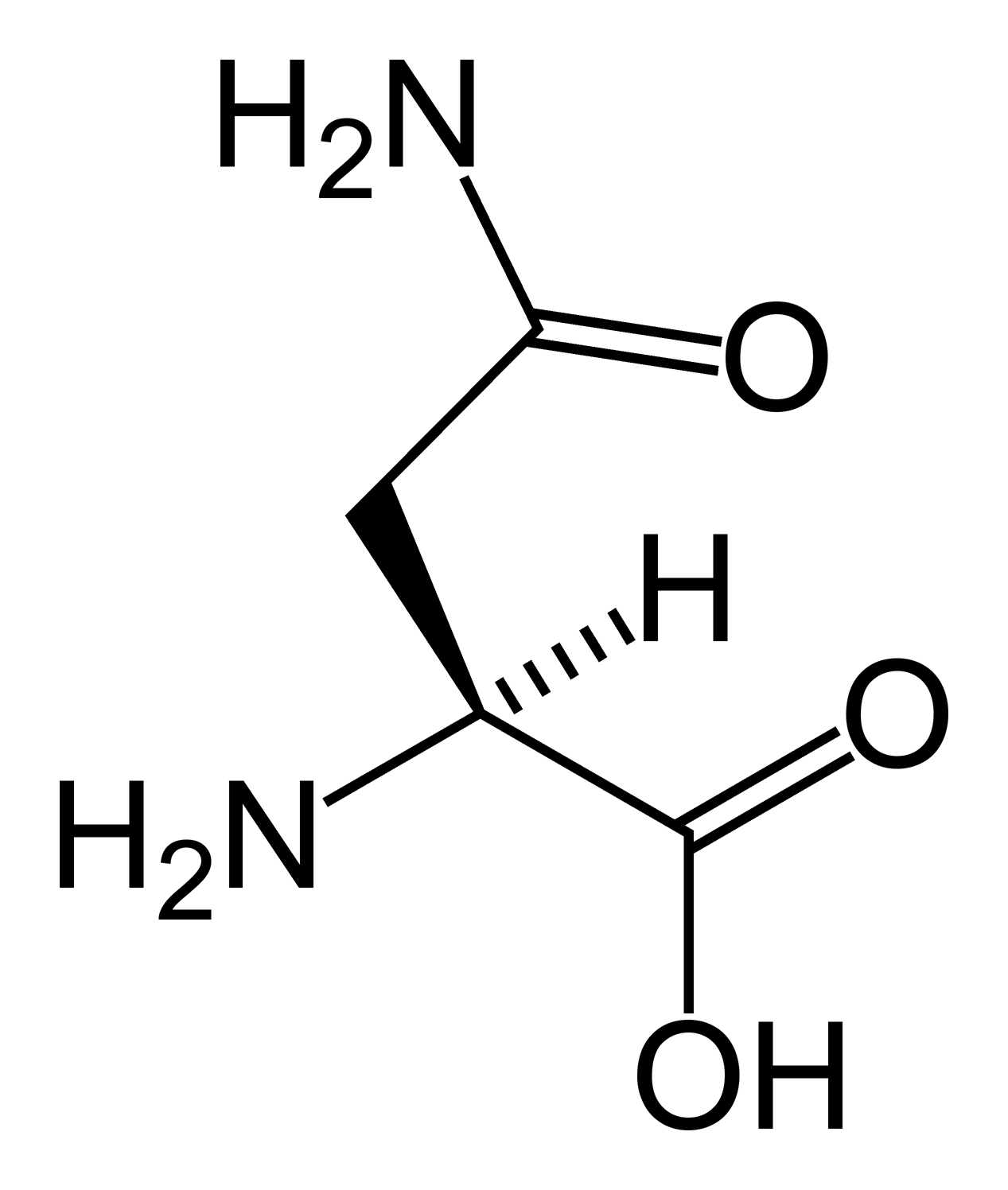
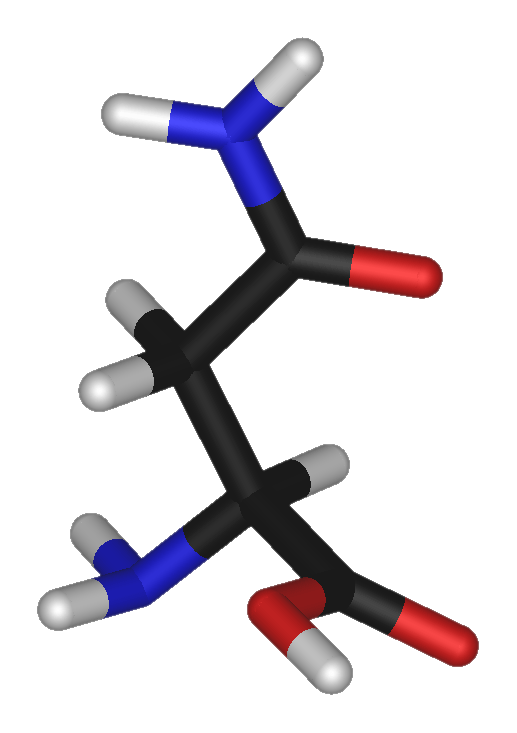
General information
Chemical formula: C_{4}H_{8}N_{2}O_{3}
Molar mass: 132.118 g·mol^{−1}
Systematic name:
(2S)-2-amino-3-carbamoyl-propanoic acid
Abbreviations: N, Asn
Synonyms:
(S)-2-aminosuccinic acid 4-amide
{α/2}-aminosuccinamic acid
Agedoite
Altheine
Asparagine acid
Asparamide
Asparatamine
Aspartamic acid
Aspartamine
Aspartic acid β-amide
Aspartic acid amide
CHEBI:17196
Crystal VI
NSC 82391
Database data
SMILES: C([C@@H](C(=O)O)N)C(=O)N
InChI=1/C4H8N2O3/c5-2(4(8)9)1-3(6)7/h2H,1,5H2,(H2,6,7)(H,8,9)/t2-/m0/s1/f/h8H,6H2

ATC: N/A	CAS: [70-47-3]	DrugBank: N/A	EINECS: 200-735-9	PubChem: 6267 (L) ^{a}

Physical properties

Structure	Crystal data	Spectral data: UV-Vis / IR / NMR / MS: Masses of main fragments: GMD MS Spectrum

Phase behavior	Solid properties T_{m}: 235 °C	Liquid properties	Gas properties

Hazard properties

MSDS N/A	Main hazards: N/A	NFPA 704	Flash point: N/A	RTECS number: N/A

Chemical properties

XLogP: -3.952	pI: 5.41	pK_{a}: 2.16; 8.73	Tautomers: 2	Hydrogen bond: donor - 3; acceptor - 4

Pharmacological properties

This box:
- Except where noted otherwise, data relate to Standard temperature and pressure.
- Reliability of data general note.
