= Alpha sheet =

Secondary protein structure

Diagram of the hydrogen bonding patterns in the alpha sheet structure. Oxygen atoms are shown in red and nitrogen in blue; dotted lines represent hydrogen bonds. R groups represent the amino acid side chains.

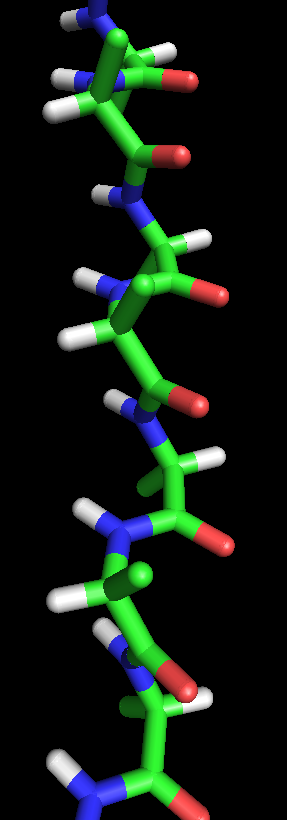
A stick representation of a peptide chain in an alpha-sheet configuration.

Alpha sheet (also known as alpha pleated sheet or polar pleated sheet) is an atypical secondary structure in proteins, first proposed by Linus Pauling and Robert Corey in 1951. The hydrogen bonding pattern in an alpha sheet is similar to that of a beta sheet, but the orientation of the carbonyl and amino groups in the peptide bond units is distinctive; in a single strand, all the carbonyl groups are oriented in the same direction on one side of the pleat, and all the amino groups are oriented in the same direction on the opposite side of the sheet. Thus the alpha sheet accumulates an inherent separation of electrostatic charge, with one edge of the sheet exposing negatively charged carbonyl groups and the opposite edge exposing positively charged amino groups. Unlike the alpha helix and beta sheet, the alpha sheet configuration does not require all component amino acid residues to lie within a single region of dihedral angles; instead, the alpha sheet contains residues of alternating dihedrals in the traditional right-handed (α_{R}) and left-handed (α_{L}) helical regions of Ramachandran space. Although the alpha sheet is only rarely observed in natural protein structures, it has been speculated to play a role in amyloid disease and it was found to be a stable form for amyloidogenic proteins in molecular dynamics simulations. Alpha sheets have also been observed in X-ray crystallography structures of designed peptides.

The regular formation of alpha-sheet by unfolded proteins inevitably involves many L amino acid residues readily adopting the alphaL conformation, which appears at first sight to go against textbook chemistry, which is that, of the 20 amino acids, it is glycine that strongly favours this conformation. The conundrum is resolved by realizing that the alphaL region comprises two overlapping areas, here called γL and αL, which should be considered separately. It turns out that, while the γL conformation is adopted, almost exclusively, by glycine, the αL conformation of alpha-sheet is more commonly, or about as commonly, adopted by any of 15 L-amino acids compared to glycine, the exceptions being proline, threonine, valine and isoleucine, which are rare at this conformation. Hence, of the 20 amino acids, 16 readily adopt the αL conformation.

== Experimental evidence ==
When Pauling and Corey first proposed the alpha sheet, they suggested that it agreed well with fiber diffraction results from beta-keratin fibers. However, since the alpha sheet did not appear to be energetically favorable, they argued that beta sheets would occur more commonly among normal proteins, and subsequent demonstration that beta-keratin is made of beta sheets consigned the alpha sheet proposal to obscurity. However the alpha strand conformation is observed in isolated instances in native state proteins as solved by X-ray crystallography or protein NMR, although an extended alpha sheet is not identified in any known natural protein. Native proteins containing alpha-strand regions or alpha-sheet-patterned hydrogen bonding include synaptotagmin, lysozyme, and potassium channels, where the alpha-strands line the ion-conducting pore.

Evidence for the existence of alpha-sheet in a mutant form of transthyretin has been presented. Alpha-sheet conformations have been observed in crystal structures of short non-natural peptides, especially those containing a mixture of L and D amino acids. The first crystal structure containing an alpha sheet was observed in the capped tripeptide Boc–Ala_{L}–a-Ile_{D}–Ile_{L}–OMe. Other peptides that assume alpha-sheet structures include capped diphenyl-glycine-based dipeptides and tripeptides.

== Role in amyloidogenesis ==
The alpha sheet has been proposed as a possible intermediate state in the conformational change in the formation of amyloid fibrils by peptides and proteins such as amyloid beta, poly-glutamine repeats, lysozyme, prion proteins, and transthyretin repeats, all of which are associated with protein misfolding disease. For example, amyloid beta is a major component of amyloid plaques in the brains of Alzheimer's disease patients, and polyglutamine repeats in the huntingtin protein are associated with Huntington's disease. These proteins undergo a conformational change from largely random coil or alpha helix structures to the highly ordered beta sheet structures found in amyloid fibrils. Most beta sheets in known proteins are "twisted" about 15° for optimal hydrogen bonding and steric packing; however, some evidence from electron crystallography suggests that at least some amyloid fibrils contain "flat" sheets with only 1–2.5° of twist. An alpha-sheet amyloid intermediate is suggested to explain some anomalous features of the amyloid fibrillization process, such as the evident amino acid sequence dependence of amyloidogenesis despite the belief that the amyloid fold is mainly stabilized by the protein backbone.

Xu, using atomic force microscopy, has shown that formation of amyloid fibers is a two-step process in which proteins first aggregate into colloidal spheres of ≈20 nm diameter. The spheres then join together spontaneously to form linear chains, which evolve into mature amyloid fibers. The formation of these linear chains appears to be driven by the development of an electrostatic dipole in each of the colloidal spheres strong enough to overcome coulomb repulsion. This suggests a possible mechanism by which alpha sheet may promote amyloid aggregation; the peptide bond has a relatively large intrinsic electrostatic dipole, but normally the dipoles of nearby bonds cancel each other out. In the alpha sheet, unlike other conformations, the peptide bonds are oriented in parallel so that the dipoles of the individual bonds can add up to create a strong overall electrostatic dipole.

Notably, the protein lysozyme is among the few native-state proteins shown to contain an alpha-strand region; lysozyme from both chickens and humans contains an alpha strand located close to the site of a mutation known to cause hereditary amyloidosis in humans, usually an autosomal dominant genetic disease. Molecular dynamics simulations of the mutant protein reveal that the region around the mutation assumes an alpha strand conformation. Lysozyme is among the naturally occurring proteins known to form amyloid fibers under experimental conditions, and both natively alpha-strand region and the mutation site fall within the larger region identified as the core of lysozyme amyloid fibrillogenesis.

A mechanism for direct alpha sheet and beta sheet interconversion has also been suggested, based on peptide plane flipping in which the α_{R}α_{L} dipeptide inverts to produce a ββ dihedral angle conformation. This process has also been observed in simulations of transthyretin and implicated as occurring naturally in certain protein families by examination of their dihedral angle conformations in crystal structures. It is suggested that alpha-sheet folds into multi-strand solenoids.

Evidence employing retro-enantio N-methylated peptides, or those with alternating L and D amino acids, as inhibitors of beta-amyloid aggregation is consistent with alpha-sheet being the main material of the amyloid precursor.
