= Amide ring =

Small motifs in proteins and polypeptides

Amide rings are small motifs in proteins and polypeptides. They consist of 9-atom or 11-atom rings formed by two CO^{...}HN hydrogen bonds between a side chain amide group and the main chain atoms of a short polypeptide. They are observed with glutamine or asparagine side chains within proteins and polypeptides. Structurally similar rings occur in the binding of purine, pyrimidine and nicotinamide bases to the main chain atoms of proteins. About 4% of asparagines and glutamines form amide rings; in databases of protein domain structures, one is present, on average, every other protein.

In such rings the polypeptide has the conformation of beta sheet or of type II polyproline helix (PPII). A number of glutamines and asparagines help bind short peptides (with the PPII conformation) in the groove of class II major histocompatibility complex proteins by forming these motifs. An 11-atom amide ring, involving a glutamine residue, occurs at the interior of the light chain variable domains of some immunoglobulin G antibodies and assists in linking the two beta-sheets.

An amide ring is employed in the specificity of the adaptor protein GRB2 for a particular asparagine within proteins it binds. GRB2 binds strongly to the pentapeptide EYINQ (when the tyrosine is phosphorylated); in such structures a 9-atom amide ring occurs between the amide side chain of the pentapeptide's asparagine and the main chain atoms of residue 109 of GRB2.
