= ST staple =

The ST staple is a common four- or five-amino acid residue motif in proteins and polypeptides with serine or threonine as the C-terminal residue. It is characterized by a single hydrogen bond between the hydroxyl group of the serine or threonine (at residue i + 3 or i + 4) and the main chain carbonyl group of residue i. Motifs are of two types, depending whether the motif has 4 or 5 residues. Most ST staples occur in conjunction with an alpha helix, and are usually associated with a slight bend in the helix. Two websites are available for finding and examining ST staples in proteins: Motivated Proteins and PDBeMotif.

Five residue ST staple. This pentapeptide shows a C-terminal threonine plus the main chain atoms of the four preceding residues. Hydrogen atoms plus some terminal main chain atoms are omitted. Carbon grey, oxygen red and nitrogen blue. The hydrogen bond is shown as a grey dotted line.
