= Asx motif =

Feature in proteins and polypeptides

The Asx motif is a commonly occurring feature in proteins and polypeptides. It consists of four or five amino acid residues with either aspartate or asparagine as the first residue (residue i). It is defined by two internal hydrogen bonds. One is between the side chain oxygen of residue i and the main chain NH of residue i+2 or i+3; the other is between the main chain oxygen of residue i and the main chain NH of residue i+3 or i+4. Asx motifs occur commonly in proteins and polypeptides.

Asx motif. The image shows a pentapeptide with an N-terminal aspartate that forms two hydrogen bonds to amino acids ahead of it. Except for the aspartate, main chain atoms only are shown. Hydrogen atoms are omitted. Carbons grey, oxygens red and nitrogens blue. The main chain - main chain hydrogen bond is in red and the side chain - main chain hydrogen bond (which also forms an Asx turn) is dotted grey.

When one of the hydrogen bonds is between the main chain oxygen of residue i and the side chain NH of residue i+3 the motif incorporates a beta turn. When one of the hydrogen bonds is between the side chain oxygen of residue i and the main chain NH of residue i+2 the motif incorporates an Asx turn.

As with Asx turns, a significant proportion of Asx motifs occur at the N-terminus of an alpha helix with the Asx as the N cap residue. Asx motifs have thus often been described as helix capping features.

A related motif is the ST motif which has serine or threonine as the first residue.
