= N cap =

Amino acid

The term N cap (N-cap, Ncap) describes an amino acid in a particular position within a protein or polypeptide. The N cap residue of an alpha helix is the first amino acid residue at the N terminus of the helix. More precisely, it is defined as the first residue (i) whose CO group is hydrogen-bonded to the NH group of residue i+4 (or sometimes residue i+3). Because of this it is sometimes also described as the residue prior to the helix.

Capping motifs are those often found at the N cap. Asx turns, ST turns, and asx motifs are often found at such situations, with the asx or serine or threonine residue at the N cap.

The C cap is the corresponding amino acid residue at the other end of the helix
