= Peptide plane flipping =

Peptide plane flipping is a type of conformational change that can occur in proteins by which the dihedral angles of adjacent amino acids undergo large-scale rotations with little displacement of the side chains. The plane flip is defined as a rotation of the dihedral angles φ,ψ at amino acids i and i+1 such that the resulting angles remain in structurally stable regions of Ramachandran space. The key requirement is that the sum of the ψ_{i} angle of residue i and the φ_{i+1} angle of residue i+1 remain roughly constant; in effect, the flip is a crankshaft move about the axis defined by the C^{α}-C¹ and N-C^{α} bond vectors of the peptide group, which are roughly parallel. As an example, the type I and type II beta turns differ by a simple flip of the central peptide group of the turn.

== In protein dynamics ==
The significance of peptide plane flips in the dynamics of the native state has been inferred in some proteins by comparing crystal structures of the same protein in multiple conformations. For example, peptide flips have been described as significant in the catalytic cycle of flavodoxin and in the formation of amyloid structures, where their ability to provide a low-energy pathway between beta sheet and the so-called alpha sheet conformation is suggested to facilitate the early stages of amyloidogenesis. Peptide plane flipping may also be significant in the early stages of protein folding.

== In crystallography ==
In protein structures determined by X-ray crystallography, poor peptide-plane geometry has been described as a common problem; many structures need correction by peptide-plane flips or peptide bond flips.
