= Dehydro-L-gulonate decarboxylase =

Class of enzymes

Identifiers
- EC no.: 4.1.1.34
- CAS no.: 9024-67-3

Databases
- BRENDA: enzyme data
- ExPASy: NiceZyme view
- KEGG: enzyme entry
- MetaCyc: metabolic pathway
- Rhea: reactions
- PDB structures: RCSB PDB PDBe PDBsum
- Gene Ontology: AmiGO / QuickGO
Search
- PMC: articles
- PubMed: articles
- NCBI: proteins

dehydro-L-gulonate decarboxylase (EC 4.1.1.34) is a carboxy-lyase enzyme characterised from mammalian kidney that catalyzes the decarboxylation of 3-dehydro-L-gulonic acid to xylulose:

3-dehydro-L-gulonic acid
CO_{2}
xylulose

The enzyme is part of the glucuronate/pentose pathway that converts six-carbon sugars to five-carbon ones.

The systematic name of this enzyme class is 3-dehydro-L-gulonate carboxy-lyase (L-xylulose-forming). Other names in use include keto-L-gulonate decarboxylase, 3-keto-L-gulonate decarboxylase, and 3-dehydro-L-gulonate carboxy-lyase.
