= Asparagine =

l-Asparagine
- Skeletal formula of L-asparagine

- Skeletal formula of L-asparagine under physiological conditions

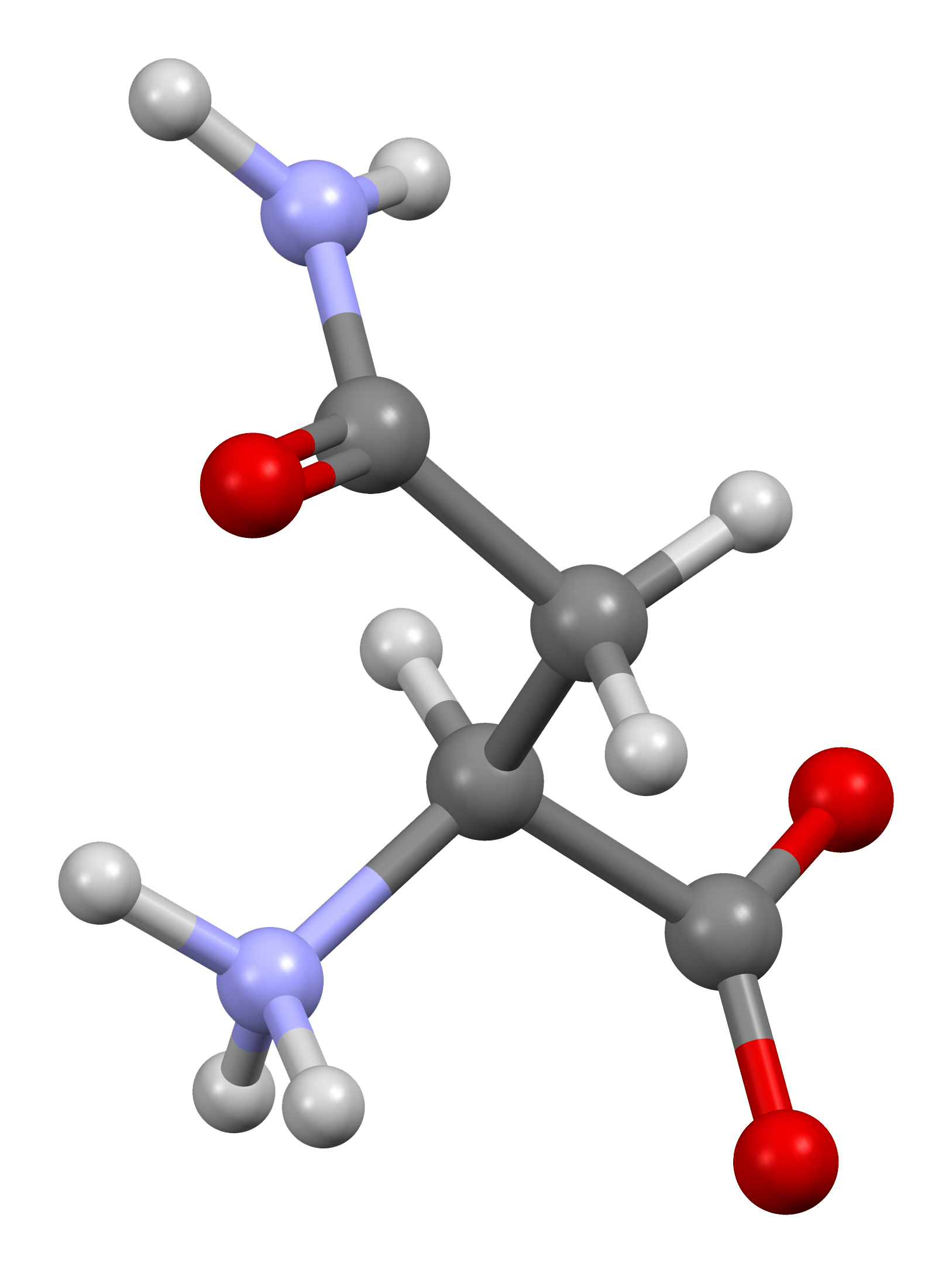
Ball-and-stick model
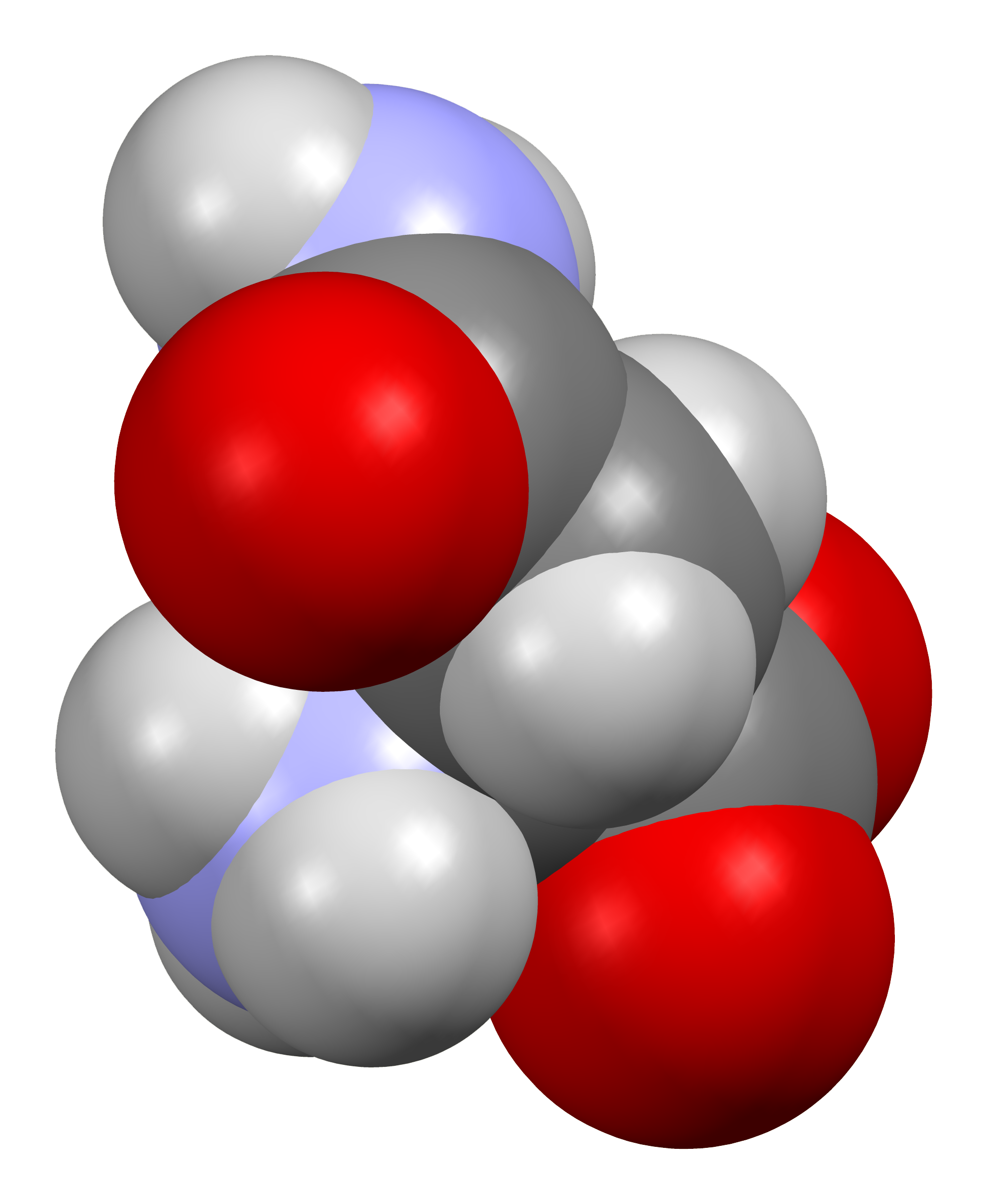
Space-filling model

Names
- IUPAC name Asparagine
- Systematic IUPAC name 2-Amino-3-carbamoylpropanoic acid

Identifiers
CAS Number	70-47-3
3D model (JSmol)	Interactive image; Zwitterion: Interactive image
ChEBI	CHEBI:17196
ChEMBL	ChEMBL58832
ChemSpider	6031
DrugBank	DB03943
ECHA InfoCard	100.019.565
EC Number	200-735-9
IUPHAR/BPS	4533
KEGG	C00152
PubChem CID	236
UNII	5Z33R5TKO7
CompTox Dashboard (EPA)	DTXSID30859927
- InChI: InChI=1S/C4H8N2O3/c5-2(4(8)9)1-3(6)7/h2H,1,5H2,(H2,6,7)(H,8,9)/t2-/m0/s1 Key: DCXYFEDJOCDNAF-REOHCLBHSA-N; InChI=1/C4H8N2O3/c5-2(4(8)9)1-3(6)7/h2H,1,5H2,(H2,6,7)(H,8,9)/t2-/m0/s1 Key: DCXYFEDJOCDNAF-REOHCLBHBD
- SMILES: O=C(N)C[C@H](N)C(=O)O; Zwitterion: O=C(N)C[C@H]([NH3+])C(=O)[O-]

Properties
Chemical formula	C_{4}H_{8}N_{2}O_{3}
Molar mass	132.119 g·mol^{−1}
Appearance	white crystals
Density	1.543 g/cm^{3}
Melting point	234 °C (453 °F; 507 K)
Boiling point	438 °C (820 °F; 711 K)
Solubility in water	2.94 g/100 mL
Solubility	soluble in acids, bases, negligible in methanol, ethanol, ether, benzene
log P	−3.82
Acidity (pK_{a})	2.1 (carboxyl; 20 °C, H_{2}O); 8.80 (amino; 20 °C, H_{2}O)
Magnetic susceptibility (χ)	−69.5·10^{−6} cm^{3}/mol

Structure
Crystal structure	orthorhombic

Thermochemistry
Std enthalpy of formation (Δ_{f}H^{⦵}_{298})	−789.4 kJ/mol

Hazards
NFPA 704 (fire diamond)	1 0 0
Flash point	219 °C (426 °F; 492 K)
Safety data sheet (SDS)	Sigma-Alrich

Supplementary data page
- Asparagine (data page)
- Except where otherwise noted, data are given for materials in their standard state (at 25 °C [77 °F], 100 kPa). verify (what is ?) Infobox references

Asparagine ball and stick model spinning

Asparagine (symbol Asn or N) is an α-amino acid that is used in the biosynthesis of proteins. It contains an α-amino group (which is in the protonated −NH^{+}_{3} form under biological conditions), an α-carboxylic acid group (which is in the deprotonated −COO^{−} form under biological conditions), and a side chain carboxamide, classifying it as a polar (at physiological pH), aliphatic amino acid. It is non-essential in humans, meaning the body can synthesize it. It is encoded by the codons AAU and AAC.

The one-letter symbol N for asparagine was assigned arbitrarily, with the proposed mnemonic asparagiNe;

== History ==
Asparagine was first isolated in 1806 in a crystalline form by French chemists Louis Nicolas Vauquelin and Pierre Jean Robiquet (then a young assistant). It was isolated from asparagus juice, in which it is abundant, hence the chosen name. It was the first amino acid to be isolated.

Three years later, in 1809, Pierre Jean Robiquet identified a substance from liquorice root with properties which he qualified as very similar to those of asparagine, and which Plisson identified in 1828 as asparagine itself.

The determination of asparagine's structure required decades of research. The empirical formula for asparagine was first determined in 1833 by the French chemists Antoine François Boutron Charlard and Théophile-Jules Pelouze; in the same year, the German chemist Justus Liebig provided a more accurate formula. In 1846 the Italian chemist Raffaele Piria treated asparagine with nitrous acid, which removed the molecule's amine (–NH_{2}) groups and transformed asparagine into malic acid. This revealed the molecule's fundamental structure: a chain of four carbon atoms. Piria thought that asparagine was a diamide of malic acid; however, in 1862 the German chemist Hermann Kolbe showed that this surmise was wrong; instead, Kolbe concluded that asparagine was an amide of an amine of succinic acid. In 1886, the Italian chemist Arnaldo Piutti (1857–1928) discovered a mirror image or "enantiomer" of the natural form of asparagine, which shared many of asparagine's properties, but which also differed from it. Since the structure of asparagine was still not fully known – the location of the amine group within the molecule was still not settled – Piutti synthesized asparagine and thus published its true structure in 1888.

== Structural function in proteins ==
Since the asparagine side-chain can form hydrogen bond interactions with the peptide backbone, asparagine residues are often found near the beginning of alpha-helices as asx turns and asx motifs, and in similar turn motifs, or as amide rings, in beta sheets. Its role can be thought as "capping" the hydrogen bond interactions that would otherwise be satisfied by the polypeptide backbone.

Asparagine also provides key sites for N-linked glycosylation, modification of the protein chain with the addition of carbohydrate chains. Typically, a carbohydrate tree can solely be added to an asparagine residue if the latter is flanked on the C side by X-serine or X-threonine, where X is any amino acid with the exception of proline.

Asparagine can be hydroxylated in the HIF1 hypoxia-inducible transcription factor. This modification inhibits HIF1-mediated gene activation.

== Sources ==
=== Dietary sources ===
Asparagine is not essential for humans, which means that it can be synthesized from central metabolic pathway intermediates and is not required in the diet.

Asparagine is found in:

- Animal sources: dairy, whey, beef, poultry, eggs, fish, lactalbumin, seafood
- Plant sources: Asparagus, seaweed (spirulina), potatoes, soy protein isolate, tofu

=== Biosynthesis and catabolism ===
The precursor to asparagine is oxaloacetate, which a transaminase enzyme converts to aspartate. The enzyme transfers the amino group from glutamate to oxaloacetate producing α-ketoglutarate and aspartate. The enzyme asparagine synthetase produces asparagine, AMP, glutamate, and pyrophosphate from aspartate, glutamine, and ATP. Asparagine synthetase uses ATP to activate aspartate, forming β-aspartyl-AMP. Glutamine donates an ammonium group, which reacts with β-aspartyl-AMP to form asparagine and free AMP.

The biosynthesis of asparagine from oxaloacetate

In reaction that is the reverse of its biosynthesis, asparagine is hydrolyzed to aspartate by asparaginase. Aspartate then undergoes transamination to form glutamate and oxaloacetate from alpha-ketoglutarate. Oxaloacetate, which enters the citric acid cycle (Krebs cycle).

=== Acrylamide controversy ===
Heating a mixture of asparagine and reducing sugars or other source of carbonyls produces acrylamide in food. These products occur in baked goods such as French fries, potato chips, and toasted bread. Acrylamide is converted in the liver to glycidamide, which is a possible carcinogen.

== Function ==
Asparagine synthetase is required for normal development of the brain. Asparagine is also involved in protein synthesis during replication of poxviruses.

The addition of N-acetylglucosamine to asparagine is performed by oligosaccharyltransferase enzymes in the endoplasmic reticulum. This glycosylation is involved in protein structure and function.

== See also ==
- Potassium asparaginate
