= Lechuza Caracas =

Venezuelan polo club

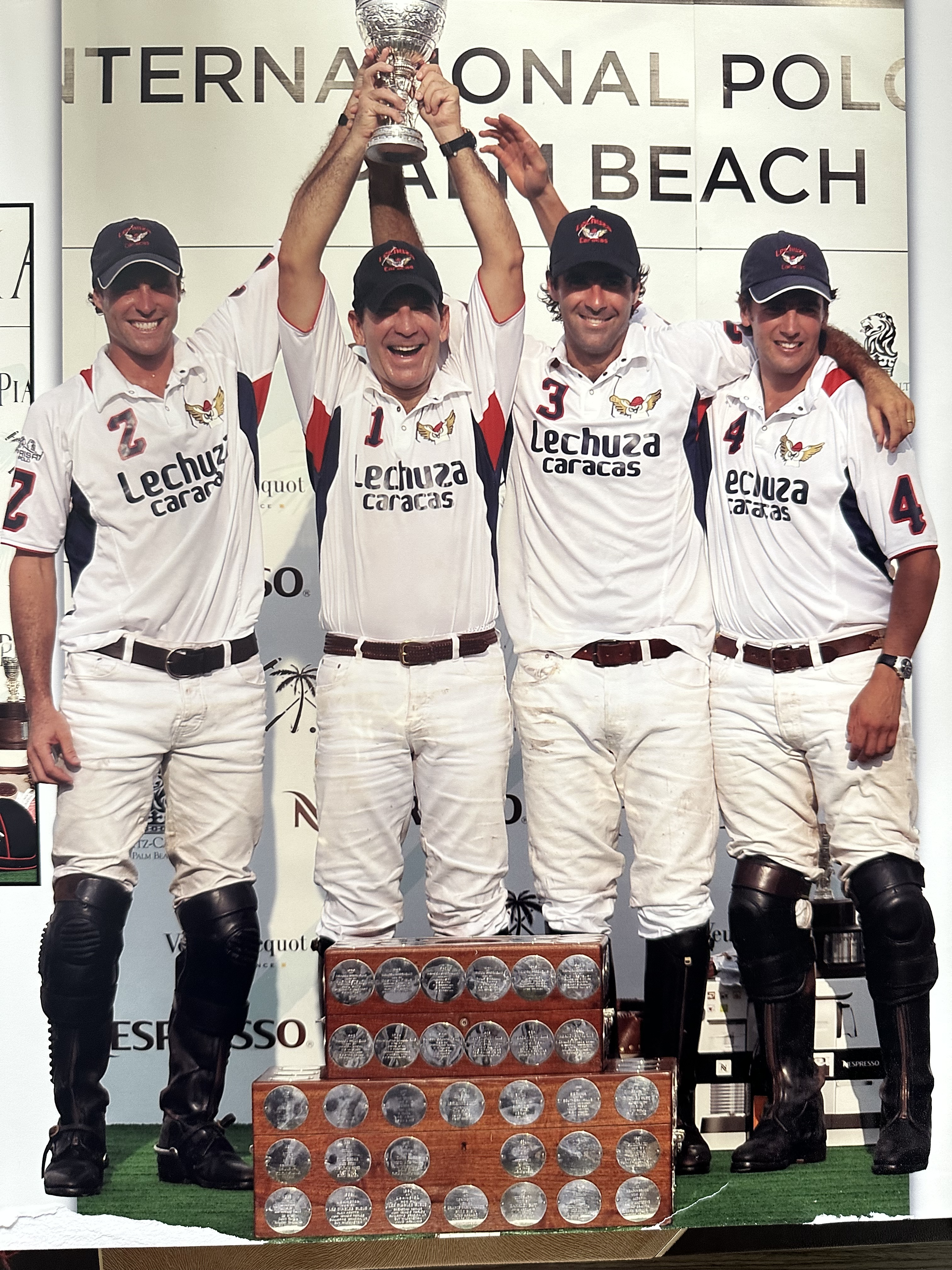
- Founded: Early 2000s
- League: High Goal Polo Circuit
- Location: Sotogrande, Spain
- Owner: Víctor Vargas Irausquín

The Lechuza Caracas Polo Club is a Venezuelan high-goal polo club founded by the banker and businessman Víctor Vargas Irausquín.

The team has competed in the most important tournaments of the sport's "Triple Crown," including the U.S. Open Polo Championship, the British Gold Cup, and the high-goal tournaments in Sotogrande, Spain.

== History and operations ==
The team was founded in the early 2000s by Víctor Vargas, who has served as the team's patron and player throughout the years.

Originally based in Florida for the U.S. winter season and later in England for the European summer season, the club moved its primary operations to the polo hub of Sotogrande, Spain, around 2015 to avoid the rainy English season.

The club is known for signing some of the best Argentine polo players on the international circuit, including 10-goal players like Juan Martín Nero and Adolfo Cambiaso (who played against them in the 2007 final).

== High-goal titles and finals ==
Lechuza Caracas has secured significant victories in the most prestigious polo tournaments worldwide, demonstrating its relevance in the sport as an elite Latin American team.

=== Chronological titles and finals ===
Major High-Goal Titles (Chronological Order)
Competition	Country	Year	Result	Ref
C.V. Whitney Cup	United States (Palm Beach)	1999	Winner	
English Gold Cup (Veuve Clicquot)	England (Cowdray Park)	2002	Finalist	
C.V. Whitney Cup	United States (Palm Beach)	2002	Winner	
C.V. Whitney Cup	United States (Palm Beach)	2007	Winner	
English Gold Cup (Veuve Clicquot)	England (Cowdray Park)	2007	Winner	
USPA Piaget Gold Cup	United States (Palm Beach)	2009	Winner	
English Gold Cup (Veuve Clicquot)	England (Cowdray Park)	2010	Finalist	
US Open (U.S. Open)	United States (Palm Beach)	2011	Winner	
Copa C.V. Whitney	United States (Palm Beach)	2011	Winner	
Sotogrande Gold Cup (Alto Hándicap)	Spain (Sotogrande)	2012	Winner	
Triple Corona (Consolidada)	Dominican Republic	2016	Winner	
Copa de Plata (Maserati Silver Cup)	Spain (Sotogrande)	2017	Winner	
Triple Corona (Consolidada)	Dominican Republic	2017	Winner	
Copa de Plata (Maserati Silver Cup)	Spain (Sotogrande)	2018	Winner	

== See also ==
- Polo
- Víctor Vargas Irausquín
