= Potassium aspartate =

Chemical compound

Names
- IUPAC name L-aspartic acid potassium salt
- Other names L-Aspartic acid, potassium salt (1:1); Aspartic acid, monopotassium salt, L-; L-Aspartic acid, monopotassium salt; Monopotassium aspartate; Potassium hydrogen aspartate; Aspartic acid monopotassium salt; Aspara K

Identifiers
CAS Number	1115-63-5
3D model (JSmol)	Interactive image
ChemSpider	64674
DrugBank	DB15819
ECHA InfoCard	100.012.934
EC Number	214-226-4
KEGG	D04948
PubChem CID	23724958
UNII	E9VW2509NH
CompTox Dashboard (EPA)	DTXSID70273966
- InChI: InChI=1S/C4H7NO4.K/c5-2(4(8)9)1-3(6)7;/h2H,1,5H2,(H,6,7)(H,8,9);/q;+1/p-1/t2-;/m0./s1 Key: TXXVQZSTAVIHFD-DKWTVANSSA-M
- SMILES: C([C@@H](C(=O)[O-])[NH3+])C(=O)[O-].[K+]

Properties
Chemical formula	C_{4}H_{6}KNO_{4}
Molar mass	171.193 g·mol^{−1}
- Except where otherwise noted, data are given for materials in their standard state (at 25 °C [77 °F], 100 kPa). Infobox references

Potassium aspartate is a potassium salt of L-aspartic acidKO_{2}CCH(NH_{2})CH_{2}CO_{2}H·H_{2}O.Potassium aspartate is also employed in cosmetics as a buffering agent.

The compound is used, as a chloride substitute in patch-clamp pipette solutions

== Chemical properties ==
Potassium aspartate is a white powder that is water-soluble. Potassium aspartate hemihydrate (C_{4}H_{6}KNO_{4}·½H_{2}O) has a molar mass of 180.20 g/mol and contains approximately 21.7% potassium by mass, or about 217 mg of elemental potassium per gram. For example, the 166.3 mg of potassium aspartate hemihydrate in one Panangin tablet (corresponding to 158 mg of the anhydrous salt) supplies 36.2 mg of K^{+}. potassium for example^{2+}^{+}

A box with tablets of potassium aspartate and magnesium aspartate

== Medical application ==
Potassium aspartate is not approved for use as a chemical in its own right (but may be approved as a component in a product covered by a group standard) in the United States or European Union or New Zealand or Australia, for treating any medical condition, but is studied as an alternative to potassium chloride to treat high blood pressure (hypertension): potassium chloride reduces blood pressure, with a more pronounced effect in patients with hypertension, averaging a reduction of 8.2 mm Hg systolic and 4.5 mm Hg diastolic; potassium aspartate may have a greater impact on lowering blood pressure at lower doses. Increasing intake of potassium-rich foods such as bananas, grapefruit, dried beans, peas, broccoli, spinach, pumpkins and squash is preferable, and potassium aspartate is studied as a potential adjunctive treatment for hypertension. Potassium aspartate is sometimes marketed in a mixture with magnesium aspartate.

Clinical evidence for the superiority of potassium aspartate is limited.

=== Chronic fatigue ===
Studies potassium 1 g 75%–91% 4–10 days with 9%–26%

== See also ==
- Magnesium aspartate
