= Magnesium aspartate =

Chemical compound

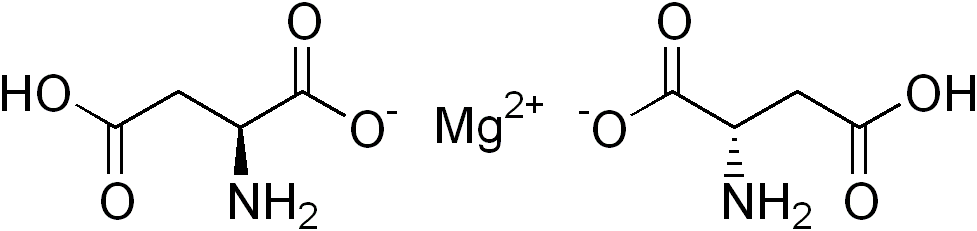

Clinical data
- AHFS/Drugs.com: Consumer Drug Information
- ATC code: A12CC05 (WHO)

Identifiers
- IUPAC name: magnesium (2S)-2-amino-4-hydroxy-4-oxobutanoate
- CAS Number: 18962-61-3
- PubChem CID: 16211203
- DrugBank: DB13359
- UNII: 082H981FMA
- CompTox Dashboard (EPA): DTXSID40889452 DTXSID10273965, DTXSID40889452
- ECHA InfoCard: 100.038.806

Chemical and physical data
- Formula: C_{8}H_{12}MgN_{2}O_{8}
- Molar mass: 288.495 g·mol^{−1}
- 3D model (JSmol): Interactive image
- SMILES: C([C@@H](C(=O)[O-])N)C(=O)O.C([C@@H](C(=O)[O-])N)C(=O)O.[Mg+2]
- InChI: InChI=InChI=1S/2C4H7NO4.Mg/c2*5-2(4(8)9)1-3(6)7;/h2*2H,1,5H2,(H,6,7)(H,8,9);/q;;+2/p-2/t2*2-;/m00./s1; Key:RXMQCXCANMAVIO-CEOVSRFSSA-L

Magnesium aspartate
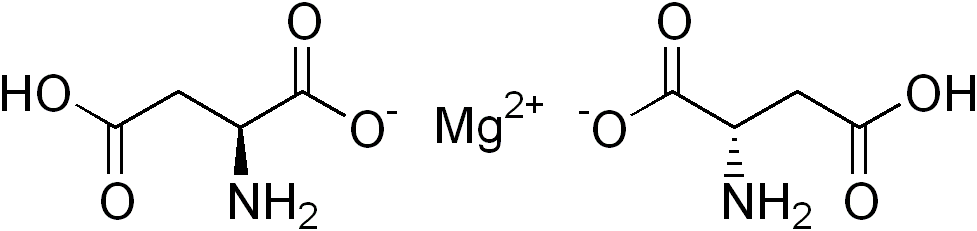

Clinical data
- AHFS/Drugs.com: Consumer Drug Information
- ATC code: A12CC05 (WHO)

Identifiers
- IUPAC name: magnesium (2S)-2-amino-4-hydroxy-4-oxobutanoate
- CAS Number: 2068-80-6
- PubChem CID: 16211203
- DrugBank: DB13359
- ChemSpider: 79273
- UNII: 082H981FMA
- CompTox Dashboard (EPA): DTXSID40889452 DTXSID10273965, DTXSID40889452
- ECHA InfoCard: 100.038.806

Chemical and physical data
- Formula: C_{8}H_{12}MgN_{2}O_{8}
- Molar mass: 288.495 g·mol^{−1}
- 3D model (JSmol): Interactive image
- SMILES: C([C@@H](C(=O)[O-])N)C(=O)O.C([C@@H](C(=O)[O-])N)C(=O)O.[Mg+2]
- InChI: InChI=InChI=1S/2C4H7NO4.Mg/c2*5-2(4(8)9)1-3(6)7;/h2*2H,1,5H2,(H,6,7)(H,8,9);/q;;+2/p-2/t2*2-;/m00./s1; Key:RXMQCXCANMAVIO-CEOVSRFSSA-L

Magnesium aspartate is a magnesium salt of aspartic acid. The chemical formula of magnesium aspartate is Mg(C_{4}H_{6}NO_{4})_{2}(H_{2}O)_{2}. It is used as a mineral supplement and as an ingredient in the manufacture of cosmetics and household products.

Because magnesium is an essential micronutrient, the use of magnesium aspartate as a supplement is intended to increase magnesium levels in the body.

== Bioavailability ==
Absorption of magnesium from different preparations of magnesium supplements varies, and the Micronutrient Information Center of the Linus Pauling Institute at Oregon State University reports that magnesium in the aspartate and several other forms has more complete absorption than the magnesium oxide and magnesium citrate forms.

In its evaluation in 2005, a scientific panel of the European Food Safety Authority concluded that the bioavailability of magnesium L-aspartate was similar to that from other organic magnesium salts and the more soluble inorganic magnesium salts. The panel concluded that organic salts of magnesium have the greatest water solubility and demonstrate greater oral absorption and bioavailability than less soluble magnesium preparations such as magnesium oxide, magnesium hydroxide, magnesium carbonate and magnesium sulfate.

== Chemical structure and properties ==
Magnesium aspartate is a compound formed by the combination of the divalent magnesium cation (Mg^{2+}) and the aspartate. The chemical formula for this compound is quoted as "Mg(C_{4}H_{6}NO_{4})_{2}", but detailed chemical analysis reveals a more complicated formula that also includes water bonded to the magnesium.

Magnesium aspartate is commonly supplied as the tetrahydrate, Mg(C_{4}H_{6}NO_{4})_{2}·4H_{2}O, with a molar mass of 360.55 g/mol. Magnesium accounts for about 6.7% of this mass, so 1 g of the tetrahydrate provides roughly 67 mg of elemental magnesium; a 175 mg dose of the tetrahydrate (equivalent to 140 mg of the anhydrous salt) supplies 11.8 mg of Mg^{2+}.

A box with tablets of potassium aspartate and magnesium aspartate

== Supplemental use ==
Magnesium deficiency is unlikely to occur from low dietary intake because magnesium is abundant in the food supply and the kidneys restrict its excretion via the urine. Long-term deficiency of magnesium may result from chronic alcoholism or some prescription drugs. Signs of deficiency that may require magnesium supplementation include loss of appetite, nausea, vomiting, fatigue and weakness. Magnesium aspartate is sometimes marketed in a mixture with potassium aspartate.

== Dosage ==
Institute of Medicine (IOM) recommendations for magnesium intake (food + supplementation)
| Age | Male | Female | Pregnancy | Lactation |
|---|---|---|---|---|
| Birth to 6 months | 30 mg* | 30 mg* |
| 7–12 months | 75 mg* | 75 mg* |
| 1–3 years | 80 mg | 80 mg |
| 4–8 years | 130 mg | 130 mg |
| 9–13 years | 240 mg | 240 mg |
| 14–18 years | 410 mg | 360 mg | 400 mg | 360 mg |
| 19–30 years | 400 mg | 310 mg | 350 mg | 310 mg |
| 31–50 years | 420 mg | 320 mg | 360 mg | 320 mg |
| 51 years and over | 420 mg | 320 mg |

- Adequate Intake (AI)

Magnesium supplements and other magnesium-containing products, such as antacids, can bind with prescription medicines, reducing their effectiveness.

== Safety ==
Adverse effects from magnesium occurring naturally in food have not been described. Excessive magnesium supplementation causes diarrhea, a side effect used by prescription as a laxative. Individuals with kidney disease have higher risk of adverse effects with magnesium supplementation. Excessive magnesium supplementation may cause a fall in blood pressure.

== See also ==
- Potassium aspartate
- Magnesium asparaginate
