= Laminopathy =

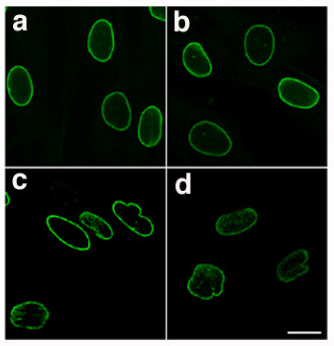
- Normal nuclear lamina (a and b) and mutant nuclear lamina (c and d) from a patient with HGPS, visualized by immunofluorescence - note the irregular and bumpy shape of the laminopathic nuclei
- Specialty: Clinical Genetics
- Symptoms: Muscle weakness, reduced sensation, shortness of breath, syncope
- Complications: Diabetes, heart failure, arrhythmias
- Usual onset: Variable
- Duration: Lifelong
- Causes: Genetic
- Diagnostic method: Clinical, genetic testing
- Treatment: Physiotherapy, orthopaedic surgery, pacemaker, implantable defibrillator
- Medication: ACE inhibitor, beta blocker, aldosterone antagonist
- Prognosis: Variable

Laminopathies (lamino- + -pathy) are a group of rare genetic disorders caused by mutations in genes encoding proteins of the nuclear lamina. Since the first reports of laminopathies in the late 1990s, increased research efforts have started to uncover the vital role of nuclear envelope proteins in cell and tissue integrity in animals. Laminopathies are a group of degenerative diseases, other disorders associated with inner nuclear membrane proteins are known as nuclear envelopathies.

== Symptoms and signs ==
Laminopathies and other nuclear envelopathies have a large variety of clinical symptoms including skeletal and/or cardiac muscular dystrophy, lipodystrophy and diabetes, dysplasia, dermo- or neuropathy, leukodystrophy, and progeria (premature aging). Most of these symptoms develop after birth, typically during childhood or adolescence. Some laminopathies however may lead to an early death, and mutations of lamin B1 (LMNB1 gene) may be lethal before or at birth.

== Genetics ==
Patients with classical laminopathy have mutations in the gene coding for lamin A/C (LMNA gene).

Mutations in the gene coding for lamin B2 (LMNB2 gene) have been linked to Barraquer-Simons syndrome and duplication in the gene coding for lamin B1 (LMNB1 gene) cause autosomal dominant leukodystrophy.

Mutations implicated in other nuclear envelopathies were found in genes coding for lamin-binding proteins such as lamin B receptor (LBR gene), emerin (EMD gene) and LEM domain-containing protein 3 (LEMD3 gene) and prelamin A-processing enzymes such as the zinc metalloproteinase STE24 (ZMPSTE24 gene).

Mutations causing laminopathies include recessive as well as dominant alleles with rare de novo mutations creating dominant alleles that do not allow their carriers to reproduce before death.

The nuclear envelopathy with the highest frequency in human populations is Emery–Dreifuss muscular dystrophy caused by an X-linked mutation in the EMD gene coding for emerin and affecting an estimated 1 in 100,000 people.

== Molecular mechanism ==
Lamins are intermediate filament proteins that form the nuclear lamina scaffold underneath the nuclear envelope in animal cells. They are attached to the nuclear envelope membrane via farnesyl anchors and interaction with inner nuclear membrane proteins such as lamin B receptor and emerin. The nuclear lamina appears to be an adaptation to mobility in animals as sessile organisms such as plants or fungi do not have lamins and the symptoms of many laminopathies include muscle defects. Mutations in these genes might lead to defects in filament assembly and/or attachment to the nuclear envelope and thus jeopardize nuclear envelope stability in physically stressed tissues such as muscle fibers, bone, skin and connective tissue.

Messenger RNA produced from the LMNA gene undergoes alternative splicing and is translated into lamins A and C. Lamin A undergoes farnesylation to attach a membrane anchor to the protein. This version of the protein is also referred to as prelamin A. Farnesylated prelamin A is further processed into mature lamin A by a metalloproteinase removing the last 15 amino acids and its farnesylated cysteine. This allows lamin A to dissociate from the nuclear envelope membrane and fulfill nuclear functions. Mutations causing laminopathies interfere with these processes on different levels.

=== Nonsense and missense mutations ===
Missense mutations in the lamin A/C rod and tail domains are the cause for a wide array of genetic disorders, suggesting that lamin A/C protein contains distinct functional domains that are essential for the maintenance and integrity of different cell lineages. Interaction between lamin A and the nuclear envelope protein emerin appears to be crucial in muscle cells, with certain mutations in lamin mimicking mutations in emerin and causing Emery–Dreifuss muscular dystrophy. Different mutations lead to dominant-negative and recessive alleles. Mutations in the lamin rod domain leading to mislocalization of both lamin A and emerin occur in patients with autosomal dominant forms of muscular dystrophy and cardiomyopathy.

Most lamin B mutations appear to be lethal with mutations in lamin B1 causing death at birth in mice. In 2006, lamin B2 missense mutations were identified in patients with acquired partial lipodystrophy.

=== Point mutations ===
The most common mutation in the lamin A/C is the homozygous Arg527His (arginine replaced by histidine at position 527) substitution in exon 9 of the LMNA gene Other known mutations are Ala529Val and Arg527His/Val440Met. Additionally, some mutations such as Arg527Cys, Lys542Asn, Arg471Cys, Thr528Met/Met540Thr, and Arg471Cys/Arg527Cys, Arg527Leu result in mandibuloacral dysplasia with progeria-like features.

=== Splicing defects ===
Mutations causing progeria are defective in splicing LMNA mRNA, therefore producing abnormal lamin A protein, also known as progerin. The mutations activate a cryptic splice site within exon 11 of the gene, thereby causing the deletion of the processing site on prelamin A. This results in an accumulation of progerin that is unable to mature into lamin A, leading to misshapen nuclei. Missplicing also leads to the complete or partial loss of exon 11 and results in a truncated prelamin A protein in the neonatal lethal tight skin contracture syndrome.

=== Processing defects ===
Since the metalloproteinase STE24 is required to process prelamin A into mature lamin A, mutations in this gene abolishing protease activity cause defects similar to laminopathies caused by prelamin A with truncated processing sites. Symptoms in patients with ZMPSTE24 mutation range from mandibuloacral dysplasia, progeroid appearance, and generalized lipodystrophy to infant-lethal restrictive dermopathy.

=== Gene dosage effects ===
In the case of autosomal dominant leukodystrophy, the disease is associated with a duplication of the lamin B gene LMNB1. The exact dosage of lamin B in cells appears to be crucial for nuclear integrity as increased expression of lamin B causes a degenerative phenotype in fruit flies and leads to abnormal nuclear morphology.

=== Autoimmune antibodies ===
Antibodies against lamins are detected in the sera of some individuals with autoimmune diseases.

=== DNA repair ===
A-type lamins promote genetic stability by maintaining the levels of proteins that have key roles in DNA double-strand break repair during the processes of non-homologous end joining and homologous recombination. Mutations in lamin A (LMNA) cause Hutchinson–Gilford progeria syndrome, a dramatic form of premature aging. Mouse cells deficient for maturation of prelamin A show increased DNA damage and chromosome aberrations and are more sensitive to DNA damaging agents. The inability to adequately repair DNA damages when A-type lamins are defective is likely responsible for some of the aspects of premature aging.

== Diagnosis ==
=== Types of known laminopathies and other nuclear envelopathies ===
Syndrome	OMIM ID	Symptoms	Mutation in	Identified in
Atypical Werner syndrome	277700	Progeria with increased severity compared to normal Werner syndrome	Lamin A/C	2003
Barraquer–Simons syndrome	608709	Lipodystrophy	Lamin B2	2006
Buschke–Ollendorff syndrome	166700	Skeletal dysplasia, skin lesions	LEM domain containing protein 3 (lamin-binding protein)	2004
Cardiomyopathy, dilated, with quadriceps myopathy	607920	Cardiomyopathy	Lamin A/C	2003
Charcot–Marie–Tooth disease, axonal, type 2B1	605588	Neuropathy	Lamin A/C	2002
Emery–Dreifuss muscular dystrophy, X-linked (EDMD)	310300	Skeletal and cardiac muscular dystrophy	Emerin (lamin-binding protein)	1996, 2000
Emery–Dreifuss muscular dystrophy, autosomal dominant (EDMD2)	181350	Skeletal and cardiac muscular dystrophy	Lamin A/C	1999
Emery–Dreifuss muscular dystrophy, autosomal recessive (EDMD3)	604929	Skeletal and cardiac muscular dystrophy	Lamin A/C	2000
Familial partial lipodystrophy of the Dunnigan type (FPLD)	151660	Lipoatrophic diabetes	Lamin A/C	2002
Greenberg dysplasia	215140	Skeletal dysplasia	Lamin B receptor	2003
Hutchinson–Gilford progeria syndrome (HGPS)	176670	Progeria	Lamin A/C	2003
Leukodystrophy, demyelinating, adult-onset, autosomal dominant (ADLD)	169500	Progressive demyelinating disorder affecting the central nervous system	Lamin B1 (tandem gene duplication)	2006
Limb-girdle muscular dystrophy type 1B (LGMD1B)	159001	Muscular dystrophy of hips and shoulders, cardiomyopathy	Lamin A/C	2000
Lipoatrophy with diabetes, hepatic steatosis, hypertrophic cardiomyopathy, and leukomelanodermic papules (LDHCP)	608056	Lipoatrophic diabetes, fatty liver, hypertrophic cardiomyopathy, skin lesions	Lamin A/C	2003
Mandibuloacral dysplasia with type A lipodystrophy (MADA)	248370	Dysplasia and lipodystrophy	Lamin A/C	2002
Mandibuloacral dysplasia with type B lipodystrophy (MADB)	608612	Dysplasia and lipodystrophy	Zinc metalloprotease STE24 (prelamin-processing enzyme)	2003
Pelger–Huet anomaly (PHA)	169400	Myelodysplasia	Lamin B receptor	2002
Restrictive dermopathy, lethal	275210	Dermopathy	Lamin A/C or Zinc metalloprotease STE24 (prelamin-processing enzyme)	2004
Microcephaly, primary	619179	Microcephaly	Lamin B1 or Lamin B2	2021

== Treatment ==
Currently, there is no cure for laminopathies and treatment is largely symptomatic and supportive. Physical therapy and/or corrective orthopedic surgery may be helpful for patients with muscular dystrophies. Laminopathies affecting heart muscle may cause heart failure requiring treatment with medications including ACE inhibitors, beta blockers and aldosterone antagonists, while the abnormal heart rhythms that frequently occur in these patients may require a pacemaker or implantable defibrillator. Treatment for neuropathies may include medication for seizures and spasticity.

== Research ==
The recent progress in uncovering the molecular mechanisms of toxic progerin formation in laminopathies leading to premature aging has opened up the potential for the development of targeted treatment. The farnesylation of prelamin A and its pathological form progerin is carried out by the enzyme farnesyl transferase. Farnesyl transferase inhibitors (FTIs) can be used effectively to reduce symptoms in two mouse model systems for progeria and to revert the abnormal nuclear morphology in progeroid cell cultures. Two oral FTIs, lonafarnib and tipifarnib, are already in use as anti-tumor medication in humans and may become avenues of treatment for children with laminopathic progeria. Nitrogen-containing bisphosphate drugs used in the treatment of osteoporosis reduce farnesyldiphosphate production and thus prelamin A farnesylation. Testing of these drugs may prove them to be useful in treating progeria as well. The use of antisense oligonucleotides to inhibit progerin synthesis in affected cells is another avenue of current research into the development of anti-progerin drugs.
