= Inner nuclear membrane protein =

Protein embedded in inner membrane of nuclear envelope

Inner nuclear membrane proteins structure. Amino-termini (N) and carboxy-termini (C) are indicated in red. Adapted from Holmer and Worman (2001)

Inner nuclear membrane proteins (INM proteins) are membrane proteins that are embedded in or associated with the inner membrane of the nuclear envelope. There are about 60 INM proteins, most of which are poorly characterized with respect to structure and function. Among the few well-characterized INM proteins are lamin B receptor (LBR), lamina-associated polypeptide 1 (LAP1), lamina-associated polypeptide-2 (LAP2), emerin and MAN1.

== Common structural features ==
Several integral nuclear membrane proteins of different size and structure have been identified. It is proposed that they share some structural features with respect to nucleoplasmic domain(s) and lipid-soluble domain(s). Some INM proteins contain common protein domain structures, and can thus be categorised into known protein domain families. These include the LEM-, SUN-, and KASH-domain families. Members of the LEM-domain family play a part in chromatin organisation. SUN- and KASH-domains participate in linking the cytoskeleton and nucleoskeleton through the LINC complex.

== Function ==
Lamins and chromatin found at the nuclear envelope are organised with the assistance of proteins embedded in the INM. INM proteins also aid in organization of nuclear pore complexes (NPCs). The protein mPom121 is targeted to the INM and is necessary for NPC formation. Proteins containing the LEM domain, such as emerin, LAP2β and MAN1, seem to have a number of roles. They interact with the barrier-to-autointegration factor (BAF). and help to repress gene expression, both by tethering specific genomic regions to the nuclear periphery, and by interaction with histone deacetylase (HDAC) 3.

== Synthesis and translocation ==
There are several proteins associated with the inner nuclear membrane. It is likely that the majority of them are also associated with the nuclear lamina. Some may interact directly with the nuclear lamina, and some may be associated with it through scaffold proteins. All INM proteins are arranged such that their N-termini is facing the nucleoplasm and targeted by various kinases. They are synthesized in one of three places; in the cytoplasm, the cytoplasmic ER, or the outer nuclear membrane. All require localisation to the INM. Since the outer nuclear membrane is continuous with the endoplasmic reticulum it is possible that the inner nuclear membrane proteins are translated on the rough endoplasmic reticulum, whereby the proteins move into the nucleus by lateral diffusion through a nuclear pore. In this model, proteins diffuse freely from the ER to the inner nuclear membrane, where association with nuclear lamina or chromatin immobilizes them. A nuclear localisation signal is not sufficient to target a protein to the INM, and the N-terminal domain of LBR cannot translocate into the nuclear lumen if its size is increased from 22 to approximately 70 kDa, supporting this view. Current opinion is that INM proteins synthesised in the cytoplasm are transported to the INM through nuclear pore complexes (NPC).

== Potential role in cell differentiation ==
It has been proposed that chromatin-binding/modifying proteins embedded within the inner nuclear membrane may be central in determining the identity of newly differentiated cells. The nucleoplasmic domains of such proteins can interact with chromatin to create a scaffold and restrict the conformation of chromosomes within three dimensions. Such inner-nuclear-membrane proteins (INMs) may function simply by restricting the movement of bound chromatin, by recruiting chromatin-remodeling proteins, or through inherent enzyme activity. INM:chromatin interactions causes some segments of chromatin to be more exposed to the nucleoplasm than others.

Once INM:chromatin interactions have been established following formation of the nuclear envelope, soluble nuclear proteins may bind to exposed chromosomal segments. Such proteins could include enzymes that modify histones—such as methylases and acetylases—which act to alter the three-dimensional conformation of chromatin, as well as DNA binding proteins—such as helicases, gyrases, and transcription factors—that are involved in unwinding/looping DNA and/or recruiting RNAP holoenzyme. This will promote the transcription of some genes and down-regulate or prevent transcription of others. Thus, the nuclear scaffold places limits on what genes can and can not be expressed within a given cell and, hence, may serve a basis for cell identity.

Once all regulatory proteins, etc. have been synthesized and the scaffold has been established, the cell has attained its own specific expression profile. This allows it to synthesize cell-specific enzymes and receptors characteristic of its particular function. The nuclear scaffold is predicted to be relatively permanent for a given cell type, but induction of a signaling pathway—by ligand binding, cell:cell contact, or some other mechanism—can temporarily shift the expression profile. When such a signal changes expression of genes coding for INM or a chromatin-modifying enzymes, it can induce differentiation in to a different cell type. Thus, the Nuclear Scaffold Theory predicts that symmetric cell division occurs when a daughter cell contains the same complement of INMs as the parent cell. Conversely, asymmetric cell division is expected to result in parent and daughter cells with different INM profiles.

The INM profile of closely related cells (e.g., CD4+ TH1 and TH2 helper T-cells) is expected to be more similar than for cells that are more distantly related (e.g., T-cells and B-cells). The degree of INM complementarity is expected to be roughly proportional to the degree of relatedness (e.g., % complementarity to TH1 helper T-cells will be: TH2 > CD8+ > B-cell > Erythrocyte > cardiomyocyte). Some cells that are very closely related may have similar INMs, but transient changes in expression—e.g., in response to extracellular signals—could possibly lead to more permanent changes in expression profile by altering transcription rates for chromatin modifying enzymes, transcriptional modulators, or other regulatory proteins.

== Examples ==
- Emerin
- Lamina-associated polypeptides 1 and 2 (LAP1, LAP2)
- Lamin B receptor (LBR)
- MAN1
- Nurim
- Dpy19L1 to L4

== Posttranslational modifications ==
Posttranslational modifications of INM proteins play a critical role in their functional modulation. For example, lamin B receptor, lamina-associated polypeptide 1 and lamina-associated polypeptide 2 are targets for different protein kinases. Arginine and serine residues phosphorylation control LBR's interaction with other subunits of the LBR complex and was proposed to modulate the interaction with chromatin.

== Disease ==
=== Laminopathies ===
The wide array of diseases involving lamins and their associated inner nuclear membrane proteins are collectively called laminopathies. Mutations in the gene EDM, encoding the INM protein emerin may be the cause of X-linked Emery–Dreifuss muscular dystrophy. As mutations in lamins cause the autosomal dominant form of Emery–Dreifuss muscular dystrophy, and lamins and emerin are known to interact, it has been hypothesised that muscle disease is caused by a structural defect in the nuclear envelope brought on by dysfunction in one of these proteins. Mutations in the gene LBR, encoding lamin B receptor, causes Pelger-Hüet anomaly.

=== Cancer ===
Tumor cells often show an aberrant nuclear structure, which is used by pathologists in diagnostics. As changes in the nuclear envelope correspond to functional changes in the nucleus, morphological changes in the nucleus may be involved in carcinogenesis. The regulatory functions of inner nuclear membrane proteins strongly suggest this possibility.

== See also ==
- Integral membrane protein
- Laminopathy
- Transmembrane protein
