= Nuclear lamina =

Fibrillar network

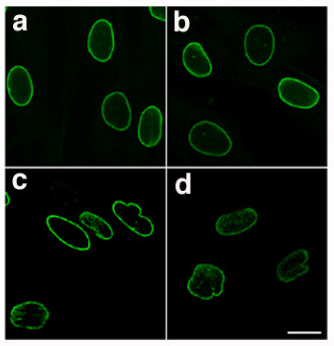
Confocal microscopic analysis of dermal fibroblasts in primary culture from a control (a and b) and the subject with progeria (c and d). Labelling was performed with anti-lamin A/C antibodies. Irregularly shaped nuclear envelopes are seen in many of the progeria fibroblasts.

The nuclear lamina is a dense (~30 to 100 nm thick) fibrillar network inside the nucleus of eukaryote cells. It is composed of intermediate filaments and membrane associated proteins. Besides providing mechanical support, the nuclear lamina regulates important cellular events such as DNA replication and cell division. Additionally, it participates in chromatin organization and it anchors the nuclear pore complexes embedded in the nuclear envelope.

The nuclear lamina is associated with the inner face of the inner nuclear membrane of the nuclear envelope, whereas the outer face of the outer nuclear membrane is continuous with the endoplasmic reticulum. The nuclear lamina is similar in structure to the nuclear matrix, that extends throughout the nucleoplasm.

== Structure and composition ==
The nuclear lamina consists of two components, lamins and nuclear lamin-associated membrane proteins. The lamins are type V intermediate filaments which can be categorized as either A-type (lamin A, C) or B-type (lamin B_{1}, B_{2}) according to homology of their DNA sequences, biochemical properties and cellular localization during the cell cycle. Type V intermediate filaments differ from cytoplasmic intermediate filaments in the way that they have an extended rod domain (42 amino acids longer), that they all carry a nuclear localization signal (NLS) at their C-terminus and that they display typical tertiary structures. Lamin polypeptides have an almost complete α-helical conformation with multiple α-helical domains separated by non-α-helical linkers that are highly conserved in length and amino acid sequence. Both the C-terminus and the N-terminus are non α-helical, with the C-terminus displaying a globular structure with immunoglobulin type folded motif. Their molecular weight ranges from 60 to 80 kilodaltons (kDa). In the amino acid sequence of a nuclear lamin, there are also two phosphoacceptor sites present, flanking the central rod domain. A phosphorylation event at the onset of mitosis leads to a conformational change which causes the disassembly of the nuclear lamina. (discussed later in the article)

In the vertebrate genome, lamins are encoded by three genes. By alternative splicing, at least seven different polypeptides (splice variants) are obtained, some of which are specific for germ cells and play an important role in the chromatin reorganisation during meiosis. Not all organisms have the same number of lamin encoding genes; Drosophila melanogaster for example has only 2 genes, whereas Caenorhabditis elegans has only one.

The presence of lamin polypeptides is a property of all animals.

The nuclear lamin-associated membrane proteins are either integral or peripheral membrane proteins. The most important are lamina associated polypeptides 1 and 2 (LAP1, LAP2), emerin, Lamin B receptor (LBR), otefin and MAN1. Due to their positioning within or their association with the inner membrane, they mediate the attachment of the nuclear lamina to the nuclear envelope.

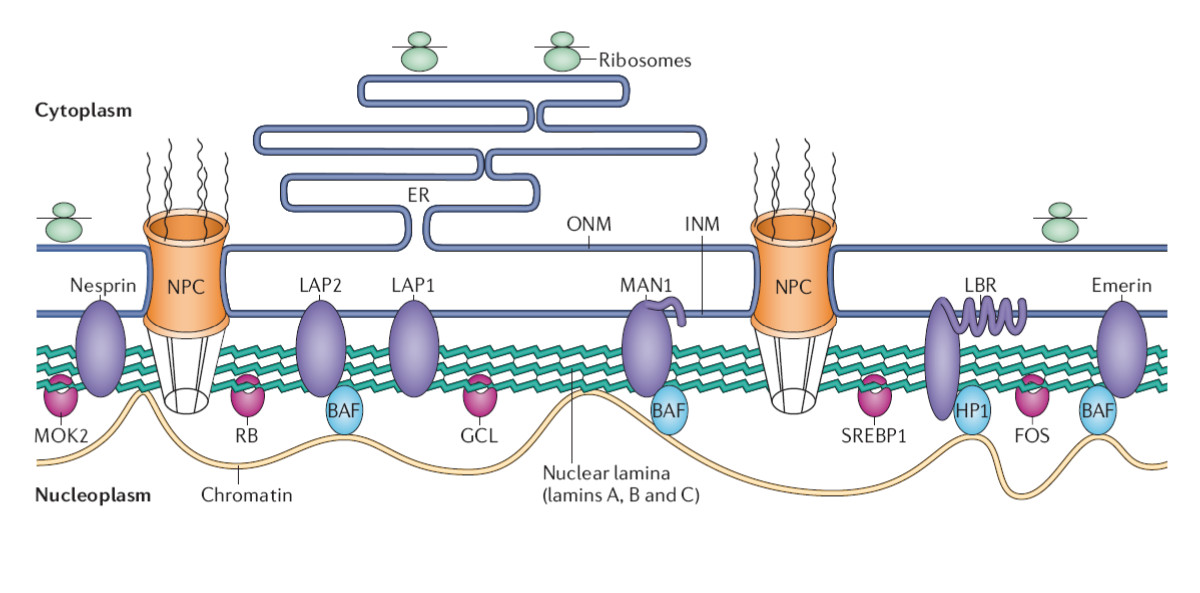
Structure and function of the nuclear lamina. The nuclear lamina lies on the inner surface of the inner nuclear membrane (INM), where it serves to maintain nuclear stability, organize chromatin and bind nuclear pore complexes (NPCs) and a steadily growing list of nuclear envelope proteins (purple) and transcription factors (pink). Nuclear envelope proteins that are bound to the lamina include nesprin, emerin, lamina-associated proteins 1 and 2 (LAP1 and LAP2), the lamin B receptor (LBR) and MAN1. Transcription factors that bind to the lamina include the retinoblastoma transcriptional regulator (RB), germ cell-less (GCL), sterol response element binding protein (SREBP1), FOS and MOK2. Barrier-to-autointegration factor (BAF) is a chromatin-associated protein that also binds to the nuclear lamina and several of the aforementioned nuclear envelope proteins. Heterochromatin protein 1 (HP1) binds both chromatin and the LBR. ONM, outer nuclear membrane.

== Role and interaction aspects ==
The nuclear lamina is assembled by interactions of two lamin polypeptides in which the α-helical regions are wound around each other to form a two stranded α-helical coiled-coil structure, followed by a head-to-tail association of the multiple dimers. The linearly elongated polymer is extended laterally by a side-by-side association of polymers, resulting in a 2D structure underlying the nuclear envelope. Next to providing mechanical support to the nucleus, the nuclear lamina plays an essential role in chromatin organization, cell cycle regulation, DNA replication, DNA repair, cell differentiation and apoptosis.

=== Chromatin organization ===
The non-random organization of the genome strongly suggests that the nuclear lamina plays a role in chromatin organization. It has been shown that lamin polypeptides have an affinity for binding chromatin through their α-helical (rod like) domains at specific DNA sequences called matrix attachment regions (MAR). A MAR has a length of approximately 300–1000 bp and has a high A/T content. Lamin A and B can also bind core histones through a sequence element in their tail domain.

Chromatin that interacts with lamina forms lamina-associated domains (LADs). The average length of human LADs is 0.1–10 MBp. LADs are flanked by CTCF-binding sites.

=== Cell cycle regulation ===
At the onset of mitosis (prophase, prometaphase), the cellular machinery is engaged in the disassembly of various cellular components including structures such as the nuclear envelope, the nuclear lamina and the nuclear pore complexes. This nuclear breakdown is necessary to allow the mitotic spindle to interact with the (condensed) chromosomes and to bind them at their kinetochores.

These different disassembly events are initiated by the cyclin B/Cdk1 protein kinase complex (MPF). Once this complex is activated, the cell is forced into mitosis, by the subsequent activation and regulation of other protein kinases or by direct phosphorylation of structural proteins involved in this cellular reorganisation. After phosphorylation by cyclin B/Cdk_{1}, the nuclear lamina depolymerises and B-type lamins stay associated with the fragments of the nuclear envelope whereas A-type lamins remain completely soluble throughout the remainder of the mitotic phase.

The importance of the nuclear lamina breakdown at this stage is underlined by experiments where inhibition of the disassembly event leads to a complete cell cycle arrest.

At the end of mitosis, (anaphase, telophase) there is a nuclear reassembly which is highly regulated in time, starting with the association of 'skeletal' proteins on the surface of the still partially condensed chromosomes, followed by nuclear envelope assembly. Novel nuclear pore complexes are formed through which nuclear lamins are actively imported by use of their NLS. This typical hierarchy raises the question whether the nuclear lamina at this stage has a stabilizing role or some regulative function, for it is clear that it plays no essential part in the nuclear membrane assembly around chromatin.

=== Embryonic development and cell differentiation ===
The presence of lamins in embryonic development is readily observed in various model organisms such as Xenopus laevis, the chick and mammals. In Xenopus laevis, five different types were identified which are present in different expression patterns during the different stages of the embryonic development. The major types are LI and LII, which are considered homologs of lamin B_{1} and B2. LA are considered homologous to lamin A and LIII as a B-type lamin. A fourth type exists and is germ cell specific.

In the early embryonic stages of the chick, the only lamins present are B-type lamins. In further stages, the expression pattern of lamin B_{1} decreases and there is a gradual increase in the expression of lamin A. Mammalian development seems to progress in a similar way. In the latter case as well it is the B-type lamins that are expressed in the early stages. Lamin B1 reaches the highest expression level, whereas the expression of B2 is relatively constant in the early stages and starts to increase after cell differentiation. With the development of the different kinds of tissue in a relatively advanced developmental stage, there is an increase in the levels of lamin A and lamin C.

These findings would indicate that in its most basic form, a functional nuclear lamina requires only B-type lamins.

=== DNA replication ===
Various experiments show that the nuclear lamina plays a part in the elongation phase of DNA replication. It has been suggested that lamins provide a scaffold, essential for the assembly of the elongation complexes, or that it provides an initiation point for the assembly of this nuclear scaffold.

Not only nuclear lamina associated lamins are present during replication, but free lamin polypeptides are present as well and seem to have some regulative part in the replication process.

=== DNA repair ===
Repair of DNA double-strand breaks can occur by either of two processes, non-homologous end joining (NHEJ) or homologous recombination (HR). A-type lamins promote genetic stability by maintaining levels of proteins that have key roles in NHEJ and HR. Mouse cells deficient for maturation of prelamin A show increased DNA damage and chromosome aberrations and are more sensitive to DNA damaging agents.

=== Apoptosis ===
Apoptosis is a form of programmed cell death that is critical in tissue homeostasis, and in defending the organism against invasive entry of pathogens. Apoptosis is a highly regulated process in which the nuclear lamina is disassembled in an early stage.

In contrast to the phosphorylation-induced disassembly during mitosis, the nuclear lamina is degraded by proteolytic cleavage, and both the lamins and the nuclear lamin-associated membrane proteins are targeted. This proteolytic activity is performed by members of the caspase-protein family who cleave the lamins after aspartic acid (Asp) residues.

== Laminopathies ==
Defects in the genes encoding for nuclear lamin (such as lamin A and lamin B_{1}) have been implicated in a variety of diseases (laminopathies) such as:

- Emery–Dreifuss muscular dystrophy - A muscle wasting disease
- Progeria - Premature aging
- Restrictive dermopathy - A disease associated with extremely tight skin and other severe neonatal abnormalities
