= Lamin B2 =

Protein found in humans

LMNB2

Identifiers
- Aliases: LMNB2, lamin B2, LAMB2, LMN2, EPM9, MCPH27
- External IDs: OMIM: 150341; MGI: 96796; GeneCards: LMNB2
Available structures
PDB	Ortholog search: PDBe RCSB
PDB	List of PDB id codes 2LLL, 5BNW

Gene location (Human)
Chr.	Chromosome 19 (human)
Band	19p13.3	Start	2,427,638 bp
Band	19p13.3	End	2,456,959 bp

Gene location (Mouse)
Chr.	Chromosome 10 (mouse)
Band	10 C1|10 39.72 cM	Start	80,737,037 bp
Band	10 C1|10 39.72 cM	End	80,754,079 bp
RNA expression pattern
Bgee	Human / Mouse (ortholog); Top expressed in: ventricular zone; left testis; right testis; ganglionic eminence; secondary oocyte; stromal cell of endometrium; mucosa of transverse colon; mucosa of esophagus; muscle of thigh; gastrocnemius muscle / Top expressed in: spermatid; seminiferous tubule; ventricular zone; epiblast; cumulus cell; embryo; yolk sac; granulocyte; neural layer of retina; renal corpuscle; More reference expression data
BioGPS	n/a
Gene ontology
Molecular function	structural molecule activity; protein binding; molecular function
Cellular component	intermediate filament; nucleus; membrane; nuclear inner membrane; lamin filament; nuclear envelope; nuclear membrane
Biological process	biological process
Sources:Amigo / QuickGO
Orthologs
Databases	NCBI: entry; OMA: entry
Species	Human	Mouse
Entrez	84823	16907
Ensembl	ENSG00000176619	ENSMUSG00000062075
UniProt	Q03252	P21619
RefSeq (mRNA)	NM_032737	NM_010722; NM_001347140
RefSeq (protein)	NP_116126	NP_001334069; NP_034852
Location (UCSC)	Chr 19: 2.43 – 2.46 Mb	Chr 10: 80.74 – 80.75 Mb
PubMed search
- Wikidata
View/Edit Human	View/Edit Mouse

Lamin B2 is a protein that in humans is encoded by the LMNB2 gene. It is the second of two type B nuclear lamins, and it is associated with laminopathies. The LMNB2 gene also codes for the testis-specific transcript, Lamin B3 generated by alternative splicing. Relative to its other isoforms, lamin B2 is the least abundant lamin in the nuclei of somatic cells. Like all lamins, its structure is composed of an α-helical central rod domain with a N-terminal globular head domain and a C-terminal tail.

== Function ==
Lamin B2 along with its isoforms comprise the nuclear matrix that is responsible for maintaining nucleus shape and the organization of chromatin. B2 has been shown to form mesh-like structures with other lamins along the nuclear envelope. These meshworks associate with LINC complexes, inner nuclear membrane proteins and underlying chromatin. In addition to its localization along the nuclear envelope, B2 also plays a role in regulating nucleolar morphology. It associates with nucleolin and nucleophosmin and localizes to the granular component of nucleoli. It has been shown to regulate expression of the 45S rRNA.

== Neurodevelopment ==
Lamin B2 is also a necessary factor in nuclear translocation, an important step in neuronal migration during embryonic development of the cerebral cortex. However, the role of B2 in the process has not yet been characterized as it is not an interactor of the LINC complex.

== See also ==
- Lamin B receptor
- Barraquer–Simons syndrome
- Pelger–Huët anomaly
