= Samp1 =

Samp1, is an inner nuclear membrane protein in mammals. Samp1 is known to interact with SUN2 and lamin A/C, and is believed to be involved in the stabilizing of the LINC complex during cell mitosis, facilitating the anchoring to the lamina. Lamin A/C is required for samp1 presence at the inner nuclear membrane. Samp1 is homologous to the S. Pombe inner nuclear membrane protein Ima1.
