= LEM domain-containing protein 3 =

LEMD3

Identifiers
- Aliases: LEMD3, MAN1, LEM domain containing 3, LEM domain-containing protein 3
- External IDs: OMIM: 607844; MGI: 3580376; GeneCards: LEMD3
Available structures
PDB	Ortholog search: PDBe RCSB
PDB	List of PDB id codes 2CH0

Gene location (Human)
Chr.	Chromosome 12 (human)
Band	12q14.3	Start	65,169,583 bp
Band	12q14.3	End	65,248,355 bp

Gene location (Mouse)
Chr.	Chromosome 10 (mouse)
Band	10|10 D2	Start	120,759,318 bp
Band	10|10 D2	End	120,815,237 bp
RNA expression pattern
Bgee	Human / Mouse (ortholog); Top expressed in: endothelial cell; cerebellar vermis; germinal epithelium; visceral pleura; superficial temporal artery; trabecular bone; Brodmann area 23; tibia; Epithelium of choroid plexus; parietal pleura / Top expressed in: hand; lobe of cerebellum; cerebellar vermis; ventromedial nucleus; piriform cortex; suprachiasmatic nucleus; superior cervical ganglion; lateral septal nucleus; habenula; cumulus cell; More reference expression data
BioGPS	n/a
Gene ontology
Molecular function	DNA binding; protein binding; nucleic acid binding; chromatin DNA binding
Cellular component	integral component of membrane; nuclear inner membrane; membrane; nucleus; nuclear membrane; integral component of nuclear inner membrane
Biological process	negative regulation of activin receptor signaling pathway; negative regulation of transforming growth factor beta receptor signaling pathway; negative regulation of BMP signaling pathway; nuclear envelope organization; meiotic attachment of telomere to nuclear envelope; angiogenesis; nucleus organization; regulation of intracellular signal transduction
Sources:Amigo / QuickGO
Orthologs
Databases	NCBI: entry; OMA: entry
Species	Human	Mouse
Entrez	23592	380664
Ensembl	ENSG00000174106	ENSMUSG00000048661
UniProt	Q9Y2U8	Q9WU40
RefSeq (mRNA)	NM_014319; NM_001167614	NM_001081193
RefSeq (protein)	NP_001161086; NP_055134; NP_055134.2	NP_001074662
Location (UCSC)	Chr 12: 65.17 – 65.25 Mb	Chr 10: 120.76 – 120.82 Mb
PubMed search
- Wikidata
View/Edit Human	View/Edit Mouse

LEM domain-containing protein 3 (LEMD3), also known as MAN1, is an integral protein in the inner nuclear membrane (INM) of the nuclear envelope. It is encoded by the LEMD3 gene and was first identified after it was isolated from the serum of a patient with a collagen vascular disease.

== Structure ==
The protein is 82.3 kDa and has a 40 amino acid long LEM domain located at its amino-terminal region. In its carboxyl end it has a RNA recognition motif (RRM). The LEM domain is also common to two other integral proteins of the INM: lamina-associated polypeptide 2 (LAP2) and emerin.

The LEM segment enables LEMD3 to attach to the barrier-to-autointegration factor (BAF), and therefore, indirectly interact with the chromatin. LEMD3 also has several implications in regulating the cytokine family such as the transforming growth factor beta (TGF-β) and bone morphogenic protein (BMPs). The RRM domain in its carboxylic region attaches to the SMAD (protein) proteins, which is involved in mediating TGF-β cellular signalling. Consequently, LEMD3 indirectly regulates downstream genes.

LEMD3 seems to play an important role in regulating the expression of several fundamental genes.

== LEMD3 and disease ==
LEMD3 has been associated with laminopathies as well as osteopoikilosis. Mutations in the LEMD3 gene have been linked to several genetic diseases such as osteopoikilosis, melorheostosis and Buschke–Ollendorff syndrome.

== See also ==
Inner nuclear membrane proteins
