= Lamin B1 =

Protein found in humans

LMNB1
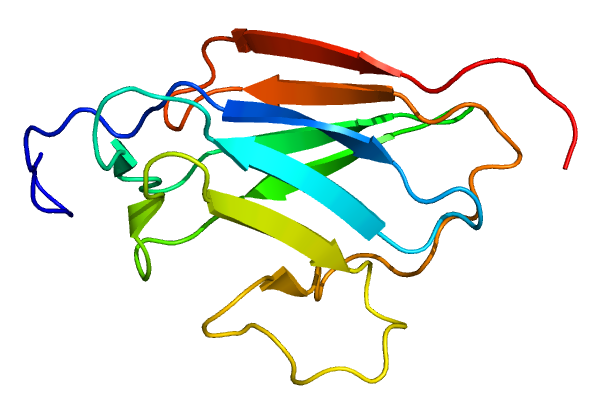

Identifiers
- Aliases: LMNB1, ADLD, LMN, LMN2, LMNB, lamin B1, MCPH26
- External IDs: OMIM: 150340; MGI: 96795; GeneCards: LMNB1
Available structures
| PDB | Ortholog search: PDBe RCSB |
| PDB | List of PDB id codes 2KPW, 3JT0, 3TYY, 3UMN |

Gene location (Human)
| Chr. | Chromosome 5 (human) |
| Band | 5q23.2 | Start | 126,776,623 bp |
| Band | 5q23.2 | End | 126,837,020 bp |

Gene location (Mouse)
| Chr. | Chromosome 18 (mouse) |
| Band | 18 D3|18 30.84 cM | Start | 56,840,885 bp |
| Band | 18 D3|18 30.84 cM | End | 56,886,496 bp |
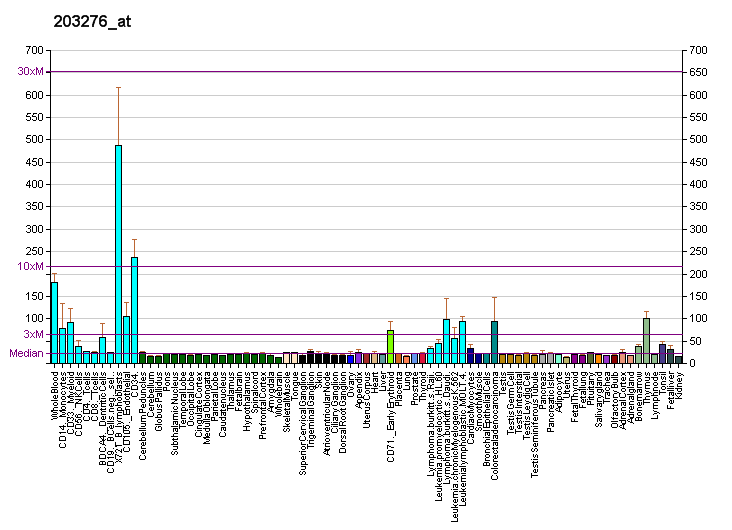
RNA expression pattern
| Bgee | Human / Mouse (ortholog); Top expressed in: ventricular zone; ganglionic eminence; monocyte; rectum; appendix; mucosa of transverse colon; bone marrow; blood; bone marrow cell; buccal mucosa cell / Top expressed in: ventricular zone; granulocyte; tail of embryo; epiblast; abdominal wall; genital tubercle; thymus; yolk sac; ganglionic eminence; medial ganglionic eminence; More reference expression data |
| BioGPS | More reference expression data |
Gene ontology
| Molecular function | phospholipase binding; structural molecule activity; protein binding; double-stranded DNA binding; sequence-specific double-stranded DNA binding |
| Cellular component | nuclear matrix; nuclear inner membrane; nuclear membrane; membrane; intermediate filament; lamin filament; nucleoplasm; nucleus; nuclear envelope |
| Biological process | interleukin-12-mediated signaling pathway |
Sources:Amigo / QuickGO
Orthologs
| Databases | NCBI: entry; OMA: entry |
| Species | Human | Mouse |
| Entrez | 4001 | 16906 |
| Ensembl | ENSG00000113368 | ENSMUSG00000024590 |
| UniProt | P20700 | P14733 |
| RefSeq (mRNA) | NM_001198557; NM_005573 | NM_010721 |
| RefSeq (protein) | NP_001185486; NP_005564 | NP_034851 |
| Location (UCSC) | Chr 5: 126.78 – 126.84 Mb | Chr 18: 56.84 – 56.89 Mb |
| PubMed search |
- Wikidata
| View/Edit Human | View/Edit Mouse |

Lamin-B1 is a protein that in humans is encoded by the LMNB1 gene.

The nuclear lamina consists of a two-dimensional matrix of proteins located next to the inner nuclear membrane. The lamin family of proteins make up the matrix and are highly conserved in evolution. During mitosis, the lamina matrix is reversibly disassembled as the lamin proteins are phosphorylated. Lamin proteins are thought to be involved in nuclear stability, chromatin structure, and gene expression. Vertebrate lamins consist of two types, A and B. This gene encodes one of the two B type proteins, B1. Lamin B, along with heterochromatin, is anchored to the inner surface of the nuclear membrane by the lamin B receptor.

== Interactions ==
LMNB1 has been shown to interact with Thymopoietin. When double-strand breaks are induced in DNA by ionizing radiation, lamin B1 promotes repair of the breaks, as well as cell survival, by maintaining the level of the RAD51 protein that is employed in homologous recombinational repair.

== Pathology ==
Mutations affecting the LMNB1 gene cause autosomal dominant adult-onset demyelinating leukodystrophy.

== See also ==
- Lamin B2
