= Emerin =

Protein-coding gene in humans

EMD
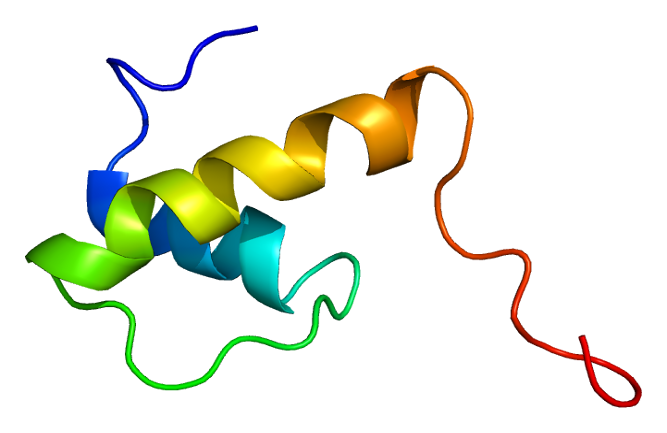

Identifiers
- Aliases: EMD, EDMD, LEMD5, STA, emerin
- External IDs: OMIM: 300384; MGI: 108117; GeneCards: EMD
Available structures
PDB	Ortholog search: PDBe RCSB
PDB	List of PDB id codes 1JEI, 2ODC, 2ODG

Gene location (Human)
Chr.	X chromosome (human)
Band	Xq28	Start	154,379,273 bp
Band	Xq28	End	154,381,574 bp

Gene location (Mouse)
Chr.	X chromosome (mouse)
Band	X A7.3|X 37.92 cM	Start	73,298,293 bp
Band	X A7.3|X 37.92 cM	End	73,305,154 bp
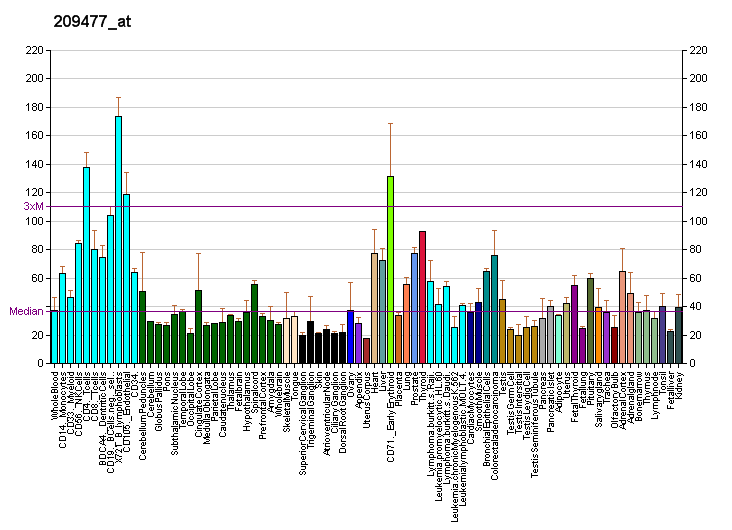
RNA expression pattern
Bgee	Human / Mouse (ortholog); Top expressed in: left ovary; left uterine tube; popliteal artery; tibial arteries; right ovary; anterior pituitary; gastric mucosa; body of uterus; right coronary artery; Descending thoracic aorta / Top expressed in: genital tubercle; tail of embryo; ventricular zone; yolk sac; lip; granulocyte; medial ganglionic eminence; muscle of thigh; ascending aorta; aortic valve; More reference expression data
BioGPS	More reference expression data
Gene ontology
Molecular function	protein binding; beta-tubulin binding; actin binding; cadherin binding
Cellular component	integral component of membrane; nuclear membrane; membrane; nuclear inner membrane; endoplasmic reticulum; microtubule; nuclear outer membrane; nucleus; nucleoplasm; cytoplasm; nuclear envelope; spindle pole centrosome; cortical endoplasmic reticulum; spindle
Biological process	muscle contraction; regulation of canonical Wnt signaling pathway; cellular response to growth factor stimulus; muscle organ development; positive regulation of protein export from nucleus; mitotic nuclear membrane disassembly; skeletal muscle cell differentiation; mitotic nuclear membrane reassembly; negative regulation of fibroblast proliferation; negative regulation of canonical Wnt signaling pathway
Sources:Amigo / QuickGO
Orthologs
Databases	NCBI: entry; OMA: entry
Species	Human	Mouse
Entrez	2010	13726
Ensembl	ENSG00000102119	ENSMUSG00000001964
UniProt	P50402	O08579
RefSeq (mRNA)	NM_000117	NM_007927
RefSeq (protein)	NP_000108	NP_031953
Location (UCSC)	Chr X: 154.38 – 154.38 Mb	Chr X: 73.3 – 73.31 Mb
PubMed search
- Wikidata
View/Edit Human	View/Edit Mouse

Emerin is a protein that in humans is encoded by the EMD gene, also known as the STA gene. Emerin, together with LEMD3, is a LEM domain-containing integral protein of the inner nuclear membrane in vertebrates. Emerin is highly expressed in cardiac and skeletal muscle. In cardiac muscle, emerin localizes to adherens junctions within intercalated discs where it appears to function in mechanotransduction of cellular strain and in beta-catenin signaling. Mutations in emerin cause X-linked recessive Emery–Dreifuss muscular dystrophy, cardiac conduction abnormalities and dilated cardiomyopathy.

It is named after Alan Emery.

== Structure ==
Emerin is a 29.0 kDa (34 kDa observed MW) protein composed of 254 amino acids. Emerin is a serine-rich protein with an N-terminal 20-amino acid hydrophobic region that is flanked by charged residues; the hydrophobic region may be important for anchoring the protein to the membrane, with the charged terminal tails being cytosolic. In cardiac, skeletal, and smooth muscle, emerin localizes to the inner nuclear membrane; expression of emerin is highest in skeletal and cardiac muscle. In cardiac muscle specifically, emerin also resides at adherens junctions within intercalated discs.

== Function ==
Emerin is a serine-rich nuclear membrane protein and a member of the nuclear lamina-associated protein family. It mediates membrane anchorage to the cytoskeleton. Emery–Dreifuss muscular dystrophy is an X-linked inherited degenerative myopathy resulting from mutation in the EMD (also known clinically as STA) gene. Emerin appears to be involved in mechanotransduction, as emerin-deficient mouse fibroblasts failed to transduce normal mechanosensitive gene expression responses to strain stimuli. In cardiac muscle, emerin is also found complexed to beta-catenin at adherens junctions of intercalated discs, and cardiomyocytes from hearts lacking emerin showed beta-catenin redistribution as well as perturbed intercalated disc architecture and myocyte shape. This interaction appears to be regulated by glycogen synthase kinase 3 beta.

== Clinical significance ==
Mutations in emerin cause X-linked recessive Emery–Dreifuss muscular dystrophy, which is characterized by early contractures in the Achilles tendons, elbows and post-cervical muscles; muscle weakness proximal in the upper limbs and distal in lower limbs; along with cardiac conduction defects that range from sinus bradycardia, PR prolongation to complete heart block. In these patients, immunostaining of emerin is lost in various tissues, including muscle, skin fibroblasts, and leukocytes, however diagnostic protocols involve mutational analysis rather than protein staining. In nearly all cases, mutations result in a complete deletion, or undetectable levels, of emerin protein. Approximately 20% of cases have X chromosomes with an inversion within the Xq28 region.

Moreover, recent research have found that the absence of functional emerin may decrease the infectivity of HIV-1. Thus, it is speculated that patients with Emery–Dreifuss muscular dystrophy may have immunity to or show an irregular infection pattern to HIV-1.

== Interactions ==
Emerin has been shown to interact with:

- ACTA1,
- ACTG2,
- BANF1,
- BCLAF1,
- CTNNB1,
- GMCL1,
- LMNA,
- PSME1,
- SYNE1,
- SYNE2,
- TMEM43, and
- YTHDC1.
