= Stodtmeister cell =

Stodtmeister cells are a sub-classification of neutrophils exhibiting a Pelger-Huet anomaly with a non-lobed nucleus that may appear round or oval shaped.
