= Mandibuloacral dysplasia =

- Other names: MAD
- This condition is inherited in an autosomal recessive manner.
- Specialty: Medical genetics

Mandibuloacral dysplasia (MAD) is a rare autosomal recessive syndrome characterized by mandibular hypoplasia, delayed cranial suture closure, dysplastic clavicles, abbreviated and club-shaped terminal phalanges, acroosteolysis, atrophy of the skin of the hands and feet, and typical facial changes.

== Types ==
Type	OMIM	Gene	Locus
MADA	248370	LMNA	1q21.2
MADB	608612	ZMPSTE24	1p34

== See also ==
- Hereditary sclerosing poikiloderma
- Skin lesion
