= Barrier-to-autointegration factor =

Family of proteins

BAF
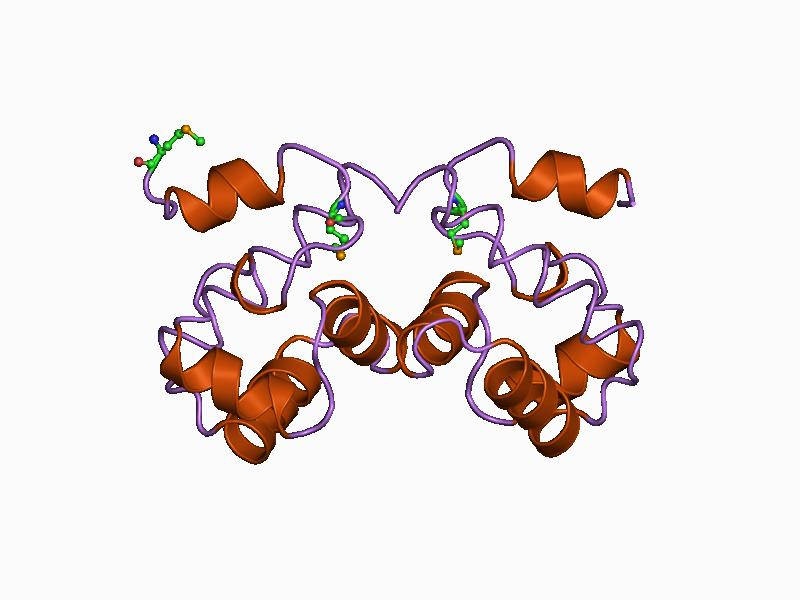
- the crystal structure of human barrier-to-autointegration factor (baf)

Identifiers
- Symbol: BAF
- Pfam: PF02961
- InterPro: IPR004122
- SCOP2: 1qck / SCOPe / SUPFAM
Available protein structures:
- PDB: IPR004122 PF02961 (ECOD; PDBsum)
- AlphaFold: IPR004122; PF02961

In molecular biology, barrier-to-autointegration factor (BAF) is a family of essential proteins that is highly conserved in metazoan evolution, and which may act as DNA-bridging proteins. BAF binds directly to double-stranded DNA, to transcription activators, and to inner nuclear membrane proteins, including lamin A filaments that anchor nuclear pore complexes in place, and nuclear LEM domain proteins that bind to lamin filaments and chromatin. New findings suggest that BAF has structural roles in nuclear assembly and chromatin organization, represses gene expression and might interlink chromatin structure, nuclear architecture and gene regulation in metazoans.

BAF can be exploited by retroviruses to act as a host component of pre-integration complexes, which promote the integration of the retroviral DNA into the host chromosome by preventing autointegration (integration into itself). BAF might contribute to the assembly or activity of retroviral pre-integration complexes through direct binding to the retroviral proteins p55 Gag and matrix, as well as to DNA.
