= AKAP8L =

Protein-coding gene in the species Homo sapiens

Identifiers
- Aliases: AKAP8L, HA95, HAP95, NAKAP, NAKAP95, A-kinase anchoring protein 8 like
- External IDs: OMIM: 609475; MGI: 1860606; HomoloGene: 8658; GeneCards: AKAP8L; OMA:AKAP8L - orthologs

Gene location (Human)
Chr.	Chromosome 19 (human)
Band	19p13.12	Start	15,380,050 bp
Band	19p13.12	End	15,419,141 bp

Gene location (Mouse)
Chr.	Chromosome 17 (mouse)
Band	17|17 B1	Start	32,321,424 bp
Band	17|17 B1	End	32,350,607 bp
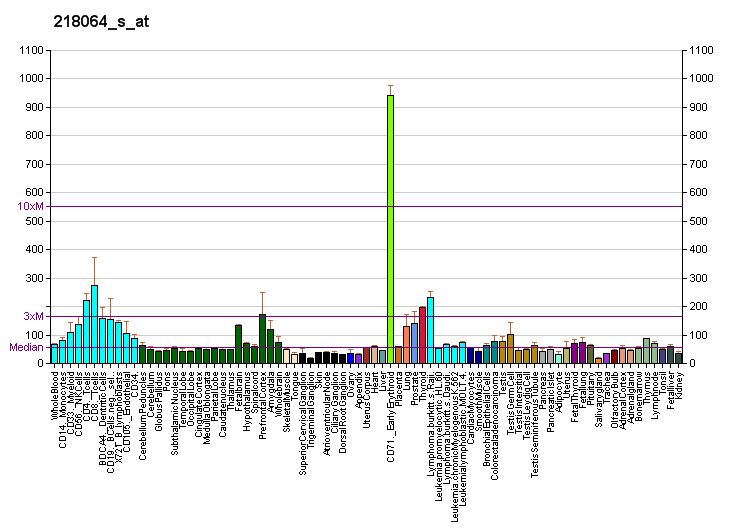
RNA expression pattern
Bgee	Human / Mouse (ortholog); Top expressed in: right hemisphere of cerebellum; right uterine tube; right lobe of thyroid gland; anterior pituitary; left lobe of thyroid gland; sural nerve; right testis; left testis; right adrenal cortex; gastric mucosa / Top expressed in: superior frontal gyrus; neural layer of retina; primary visual cortex; entorhinal cortex; spermatid; cerebellar cortex; muscle of thigh; perirhinal cortex; central gray substance of midbrain; spermatocyte; More reference expression data
BioGPS	More reference expression data
Gene ontology
Molecular function	metal ion binding; lamin binding; histone deacetylase binding; DEAD/H-box RNA helicase binding; DNA binding; protein binding; RNA binding; protein kinase A regulatory subunit binding
Cellular component	nuclear matrix; chromatin; nuclear speck; PML body; nucleus; cytoplasm; ribonucleoprotein complex
Biological process	positive regulation of histone deacetylation; nuclear membrane disassembly; regulation of mRNA export from nucleus; mitotic chromosome condensation; cell cycle G2/M phase transition; positive regulation of transcription by RNA polymerase II; transcription, DNA-templated; regulation of transcription, DNA-templated; RNA splicing; mRNA processing
Sources:Amigo / QuickGO
Orthologs
Species	Human	Mouse
Entrez	26993	54194
Ensembl	ENSG00000011243	ENSMUSG00000002625
UniProt	Q9ULX6	Q9R0L7
RefSeq (mRNA)	NM_001291478; NM_014371	NM_017476
RefSeq (protein)	NP_001278407; NP_055186	n/a
Location (UCSC)	Chr 19: 15.38 – 15.42 Mb	Chr 17: 32.32 – 32.35 Mb
PubMed search
- Wikidata
View/Edit Human	View/Edit Mouse

A-kinase anchor protein 8-like is a protein that in humans is encoded by the AKAP8L gene.

== Interactions ==
AKAP8L has been shown to interact with:

- DHX9, and
- Thymopoietin.
