= LINC complex =

The linker of nucleoskeleton and cytoskeleton (LINC) complex is a protein complex associated with both inner and outer membranes of the nucleus. It is composed of SUN-domain proteins and KASH-domain proteins. The SUN-domain proteins are membrane-embedded proteins within the inner nuclear membrane (INM). They interact with nuclear lamins, chromatin and an assortment of INM filament and polymer networks within the nucleus. Likewise, KASH domain proteins (called Nesprins in mammals) are embedded in the outer nuclear membrane (ONM) and interact with the SUN-domain proteins in the perinuclear (lumen) space between the two membranes. This interaction within the nuclear envelope lumen composes higher-order assemblies that are responsible for the transmission of force across the nuclear envelope. The KASH domain proteins also cross the outer nuclear membrane to interact with actin filaments, microtubule filaments (through dynein and kinesin motors), intermediate filaments (through spectrin), centrosomes and cytoplasmic organelles. The number of SUN-domain and KASH-domain proteins increased in evolution.

== Components ==
=== Inner Nuclear Membrane ===
The Sad-1 and UNC-84 (SUN) domain-containing proteins within the nucleus interact with lamins A, B, C and chromosomes. Within the perinuclear space (between inner and outer nuclear membranes) are SUN-1 and -2 which form connections with the KASH domain proteins on nesprin and the nuclear envelope lumen. Interestingly, the removal of either SUN -1 or -2 individually will not disrupt LINC complex connectivity, indicating the similarity between the two proteins. Their structure and function may appear to be similar, but not identical; Their mode of binding differentiate them: SUN -1 anchors to the nuclear envelope in the absence of lamin A/C, meanwhile SUN -2 is anchored to the nuclear envelope with help from lamin A/C. Furthermore, SUN -2 has much more involvement within structuring higher-order systems (such as the LINC complex), whereas SUN -1 predominantly interacts with nuclear pore complexes and meiosis.

=== Outer Nuclear Membrane ===
The KASH family of proteins is a major component of the LINC complex, totaling six members and ultimately engaging with all aspects of the cytoskeleton. A significant portion of the KASH family are the four nesprin proteins: nesprin -1 (encoded by SYNE1), nesprin -2 (encoded by SYNE2), nesprin -3 (encoded by SYNE3), and nesprin -4 (encoded by SYNE4); The other two KASH family protein members are Jaw1/LRMP (encoded by JAW1) and KASH5 (encoded by KASH5). The nesprin family is evolutionarily conserved, signified by the four evolutions of the nesprin protein. The largest of the nesprin proteins at their full length are aptly titled 'giant' nesprin -1 and -2. These two nesprin contain three major domains: the N-terminal domain binds to the actin cytoskeleton through Calponin Homology (CH), the C-terminal KASH domain binds to the nuclear envelope, and a central rod domain with multiple spectrin repeats connects CH and KASH domains for protein-protein interactions.

== Function ==
The function of the LINC complex appears to be in many cell activities. One of the primary features of the LINC Complex is nuclear relocation and orientation. Similarly, the LINC complex is involved with moving meiotic chromosomes to find their homologues at leptotene/zygotene, attaching the centrosome to the outer nuclear membrane, formation of the nuclear pore complex, and responding to extracellular mechanical stimuli. Many of the functions previously listed can be correlated to a cellular response to an external stimulus. LINC complex, by virtue of providing internal cell connectivity, is required for sensing of various mechanical stimuli.

There is an important connection between the integral LINC complex component lamin A/C and chromatin/chromosome expression. While the exact mechanism is not yet fully understood, it is speculated that a dense network of lamin A/C controls the access to heterochromatin and transcription factor localization. This is supported by low lamin A/C concentrations seen in embryonic stem cells while in an open chromatin state. The removal of major LINC complex component nesprin -2 has been observed to alter the localization of integral histones for wound healing, further connecting LINC complex to gene expression and controlling cellular fate.

=== LINC Complex's Role in Mechanotransduction ===
Mechanotransduction has been established as the ability of the nucleus to sense mechanical forces which triggers a biological response, converting the initial stimulus into some form of electrochemical activity. This phenomenon can be evoked through a multitude of mechanical pathways, including compression, shear stresses, osmotic changes, cell adhesions, vibrational stimuli and intracellular generated forces. The LINC complex's biggest strength is the existence of the physical connection which links cytoplasmic actin to the lamins of the nucleus. Therefore, signals are capable of transmitting upwards of 12.5 - 25 times faster than what is seen from passive diffusion or molecular-based signaling, thus allowing the nucleus to respond within minutes. Nuclear stiffening is one particular response controlled by LINC complex interaction, which was found to be initiated through the actin-binding nesprin -1 in the cytoskeleton. Stretching nesprin -1 triggers a rapid phosphorylation of emerin, located at the inner nuclear membrane, which alters lamin A and begins a downstream transcription cascade of mechanically regulated genes.

Mechanical forces received by the LINC complex can also impact protein transfer across the nuclear envelope due to the LINC complex's connection with nuclear pore complexes (NPCs). NPCs interact with lamina within the nucleus as well as SUN-1, directly connecting them to the nuclear responses to force transmission. One protein pathway, YAP/TAZ, has been shown to import into the nucleus under nucleus deformation or strain. Similarly, work from the Driscoll laboratory demonstrated that the import of YAP under strain of the nucleus is hindered if the LINC complex is disrupted via knockdown of nesprin -1 giant.
