= Prelamin-A/C =

Filament protein

LMNA
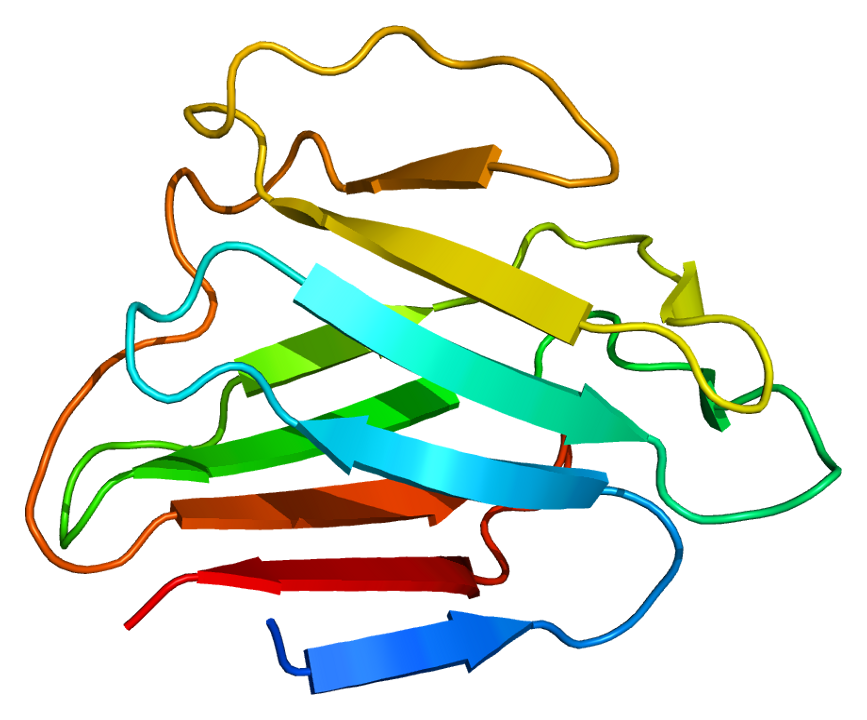

Identifiers
- Aliases: LMNA, CDCD1, CDDC, CMD1A, CMT2B1, EMD2, FPL, FPLD, FPLD2, HGPS, IDC, LDP1, LFP, LGMD1B, LMN1, LMNC, LMNL1, PRO1, lamin A/C, MADA, A-type lamin
- External IDs: OMIM: 150330; MGI: 96794; GeneCards: LMNA
Available structures
PDB	Ortholog search: PDBe RCSB
PDB	List of PDB id codes 1IFR, 1IVT, 1X8Y, 2XV5, 2YPT, 3GEF, 3V4Q, 3V4W, 3V5B

Gene location (Human)
Chr.	Chromosome 1 (human)
Band	1q22	Start	156,082,573 bp
Band	1q22	End	156,140,081 bp

Gene location (Mouse)
Chr.	Chromosome 3 (mouse)
Band	3 F1|3 38.84 cM	Start	88,387,454 bp
Band	3 F1|3 38.84 cM	End	88,417,263 bp
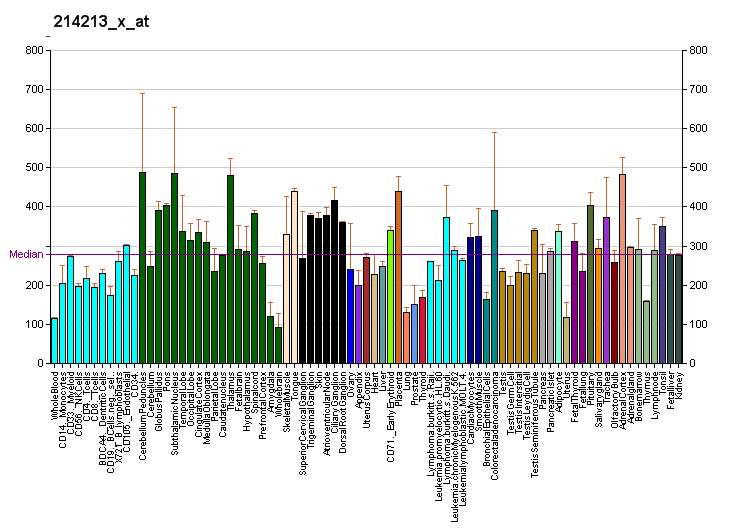

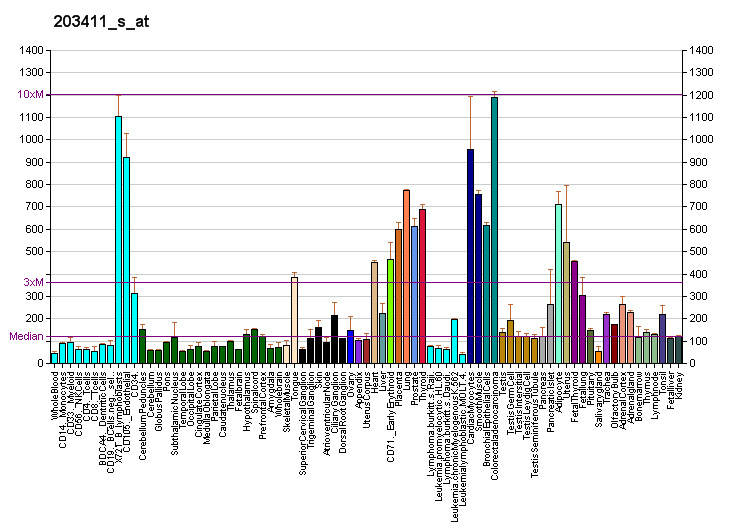

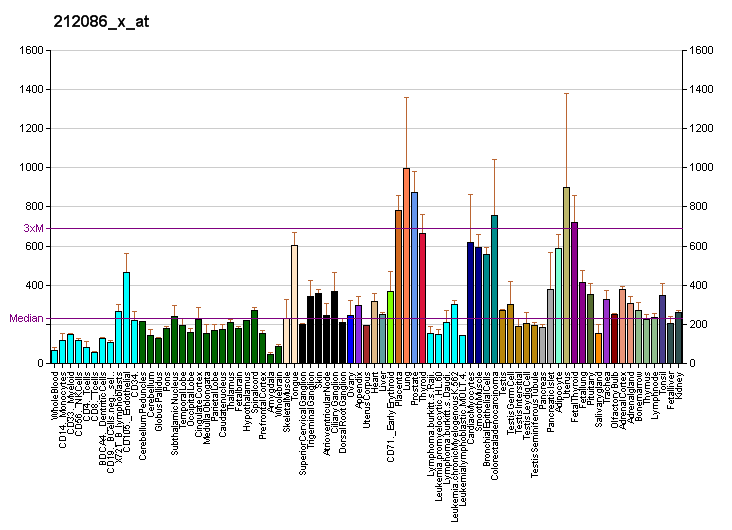
RNA expression pattern
Bgee	Human / Mouse (ortholog); Top expressed in: nipple; gastric mucosa; skin of abdomen; tendon of biceps brachii; gallbladder; skin of leg; Descending thoracic aorta; stromal cell of endometrium; Achilles tendon; left uterine tube / Top expressed in: ascending aorta; aortic valve; external carotid artery; internal carotid artery; endothelial cell of lymphatic vessel; lip; condyle; skin of back; skin of external ear; lactiferous gland; More reference expression data
BioGPS	More reference expression data
Gene ontology
Molecular function	structural molecule activity; protein binding; identical protein binding
Cellular component	nuclear lamina; cytosol; nuclear speck; lamin filament; perinuclear region of cytoplasm; intermediate filament; nucleus; extracellular matrix; nuclear membrane; nucleoplasm; nuclear envelope
Biological process	regulation of cell migration; nucleus organization; establishment or maintenance of microtubule cytoskeleton polarity; negative regulation of release of cytochrome c from mitochondria; negative regulation of extrinsic apoptotic signaling pathway; muscle organ development; regulation of protein localization to nucleus; IRE1-mediated unfolded protein response; mitotic nuclear membrane disassembly; protein localization to nucleus; mitotic nuclear membrane reassembly; ventricular cardiac muscle cell development; cellular response to hypoxia; positive regulation of gene expression; negative regulation of mesenchymal cell proliferation; nuclear envelope organization; negative regulation of cell population proliferation; regulation of telomere maintenance; negative regulation of cardiac muscle hypertrophy in response to stress; protein import into nucleus; regulation of protein stability; positive regulation of histone H3-K9 trimethylation
Sources:Amigo / QuickGO
Orthologs
Databases	NCBI: entry; OMA: entry
Species	Human	Mouse
Entrez	4000	16905
Ensembl	ENSG00000160789	ENSMUSG00000028063
UniProt	P02545	P48678
RefSeq (mRNA)	NM_001257374; NM_001282624; NM_001282625; NM_001282626; NM_005572 NM_170707; NM_170708	NM_001002011; NM_001111102; NM_019390
RefSeq (protein)	NP_001244303; NP_001269553; NP_001269554; NP_001269555; NP_005563 NP_733821; NP_733822	NP_001002011; NP_001104572; NP_062263
Location (UCSC)	Chr 1: 156.08 – 156.14 Mb	Chr 3: 88.39 – 88.42 Mb
PubMed search
- Wikidata
View/Edit Human	View/Edit Mouse

Prelamin-A/C, or lamin A/C is a protein that in humans is encoded by the LMNA gene. Lamin A/C belongs to the lamin family of proteins.

== Function ==
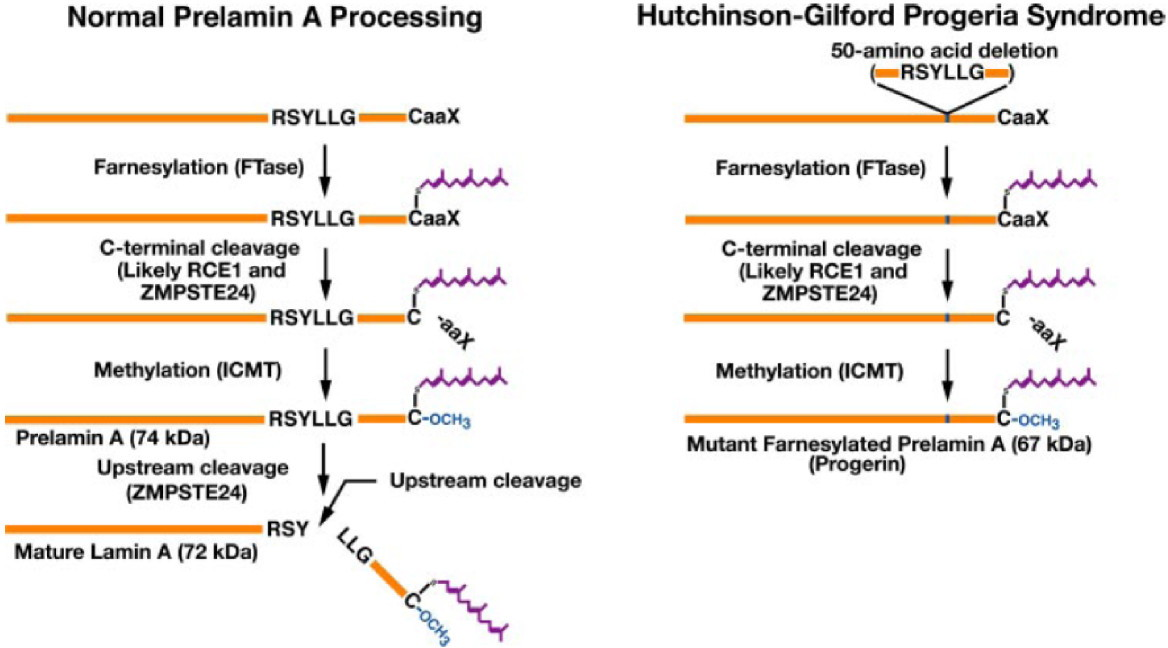
Biogenesis of lamin A in normal cells and the failure to generate mature lamin A in Hutchinson–Gilford progeria syndrome.

In the setting of ZMPSTE24 deficiency, the final step of lamin processing does not occur, resulting in an accumulation of farnesyl-prelamin A. In Hutchinson–Gilford progeria syndrome, a 50-amino acid deletion in prelamin A (amino acids 607–656) removes the site for the second endoproteolytic cleavage. Consequently, no mature lamin A is formed, and a farnesylated mutant prelamin A (progerin) accumulates in cells. The nuclear lamina consist of a two-dimensional matrix of proteins located next to the inner nuclear membrane. The lamin family of proteins make up the matrix and are highly conserved in evolution. During mitosis, the lamina matrix is reversibly disassembled as the lamin proteins are phosphorylated. Lamin proteins are thought to be involved in nuclear stability, chromatin structure and gene expression. Vertebrate lamins consist of two types, A and B. Through alternate splicing, this gene encodes three type A lamin isoforms.

Early in mitosis, maturation promoting factor (abbreviated MPF, also called mitosis-promoting factor or M-phase-promoting factor) phosphorylates specific serine residues in all three nuclear lamins, causing depolymerization of the lamin intermediate filaments. The phosphorylated lamin B dimers remain associated with the nuclear membrane via their isoprenyl anchor. Lamin A is targeted to the nuclear membrane by an isoprenyl group but it is cleaved shortly after arriving at the membrane. It stays associated with the membrane through protein-protein interactions of itself and other membrane associated proteins, such as TOR1AIP1 (LAP1). Depolymerization of the nuclear lamins leads to disintegration of the nuclear envelope. Transfection experiments demonstrate that phosphorylation of human lamin A is required for lamin depolymerization, and thus for disassembly of the nuclear envelope, which normally occurs early in mitosis.

== Clinical significance ==
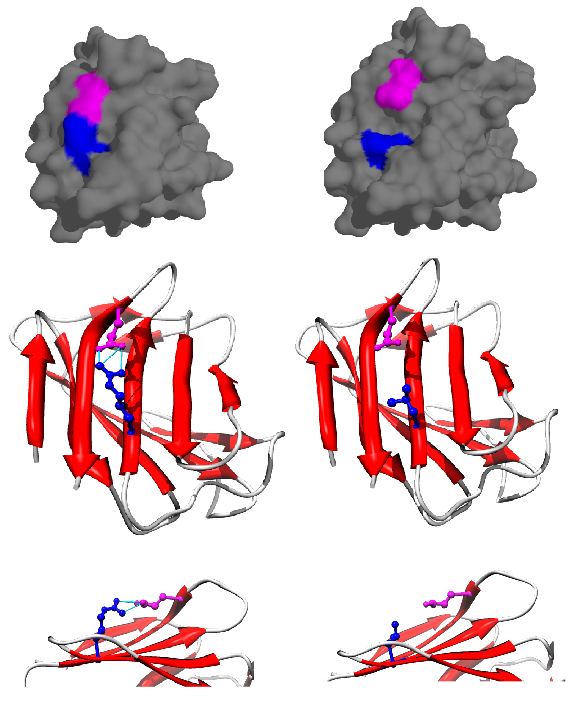
Wild type (left) and mutated (right) form of the Ig-fold of lamin A (LMNA, PDB: 1IFR). Normally, arginine 527 (blue) forms a salt bridge with glutamate 537 (magenta), but R527L substitution results in breaking this interaction (leucine is too short to reach glutamate). Models are presented in surface (upper) and in cartoon (lower) representation.

Mutations in the LMNA gene are associated with several diseases, including Emery–Dreifuss muscular dystrophy, familial partial lipodystrophy, limb girdle muscular dystrophy, dilated cardiomyopathy, Charcot–Marie–Tooth disease, and restrictive dermopathy. A truncated version of lamin A, commonly known as progerin, causes Hutchinson-Gilford-Progeria syndrome. To date over 1,400 SNPs are known. They can manifest in changes on mRNA, splicing or protein (e.g. Arg471Cys, Arg482Gln, Arg527Leu, Arg527Cys, Ala529Val) level.

== DNA damage ==
DNA double-strand damages can be repaired by either homologous recombination (HR) or non-homologous end joining (NHEJ). LMNA promotes genetic stability by maintaining the levels of proteins that have key roles in HR and NHEJ. Mouse cells that are deficient for maturation of prelamin A have increased DNA damage and chromosome aberrations, and show increased sensitivity to DNA damaging agents. In progeria, the inadequacy of DNA repair, due to defective LMNA, may cause features of premature aging (see DNA damage theory of aging).

== Interactions ==
LMNA has been shown to interact with:

- ALOX12
- EMD
- NARF
- SREBF1
- TMPO
- ZNF239
- SIRT1
