= Nesprin =

Identifiers
- Symbol: Nesprin
- InterPro: IPR030265
- Membranome: 123
Available protein structures:
- PDB: IPR030265
- AlphaFold: IPR030265

Nesprins (nuclear envelope spectrin repeat proteins) are a family of proteins that are found primarily in the outer nuclear membrane, as well as other subcellular compartments. They contain a C-terminal KASH transmembrane domain and are part of the LINC complex (Linker of Nucleoskeleton and Cytoskeleton) which is a protein network that associates the nuclear envelope (the membrane surrounding the nucleus) to the cytoskeleton, outside the nucleus, and the nuclear lamina, inside the nucleus. Nesprin-1 and -2 bind to the actin filaments. Nesprin-3 binds to plectin, which is bound to the intermediate filaments, while nesprin-4 interacts with kinesin-1.

Nesprin mediated connections to the cytoskeleton provides mechanosensory functions in cells, as the absence or disruption of Nesprin family members at the nuclear envelope interferes with the cell's ability to sense and respond to mechanical challenges.

== See also ==
- SYNE1
- SYNE2
- Spectrin repeat containing nuclear envelope family member 3
