= Thymopoietin =

Protein found in humans

TMPO
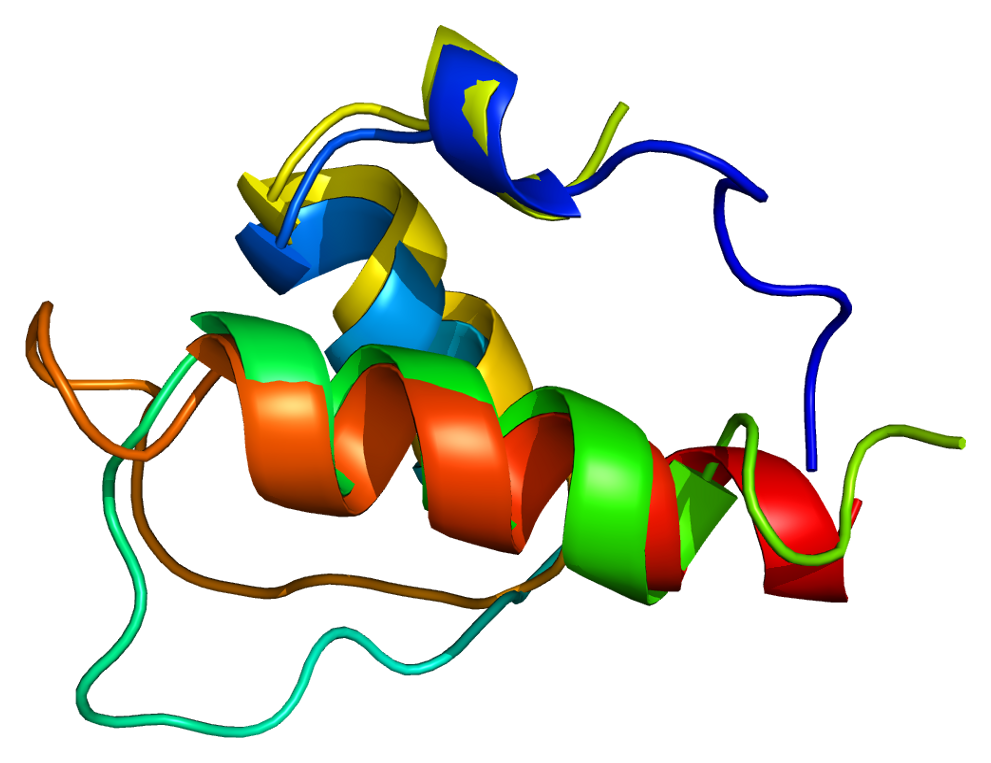

Identifiers
- Aliases: TMPO, CMD1T, LAP2, LEMD4, PRO0868, TP, thymopoietin
- External IDs: OMIM: 188380; MGI: 106920; GeneCards: TMPO
Available structures
PDB	Ortholog search: PDBe RCSB
PDB	List of PDB id codes 1GJJ, 1H9F, 1H9E

Gene location (Human)
Chr.	Chromosome 12 (human)
Band	12q23.1	Start	98,515,579 bp
Band	12q23.1	End	98,550,351 bp

Gene location (Mouse)
Chr.	Chromosome 10 (mouse)
Band	10 C2|10 45.66 cM	Start	90,983,433 bp
Band	10 C2|10 45.66 cM	End	91,017,177 bp
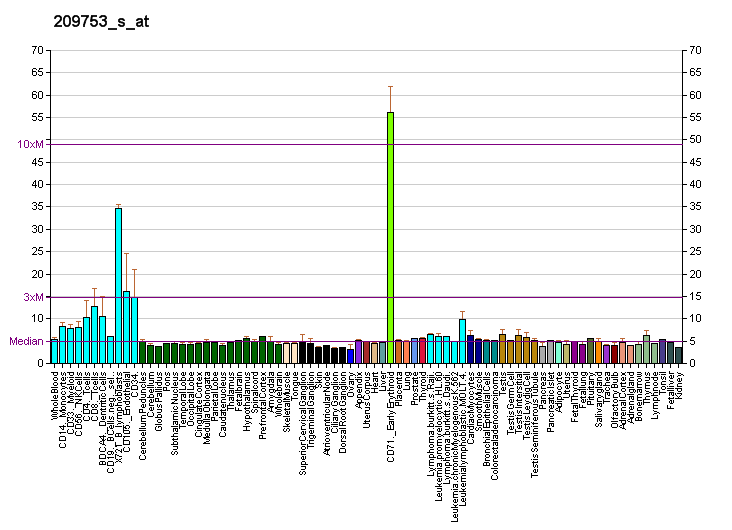

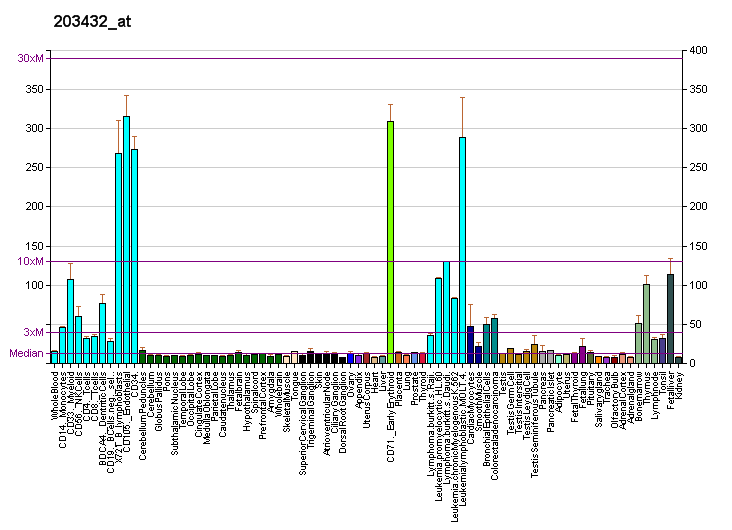

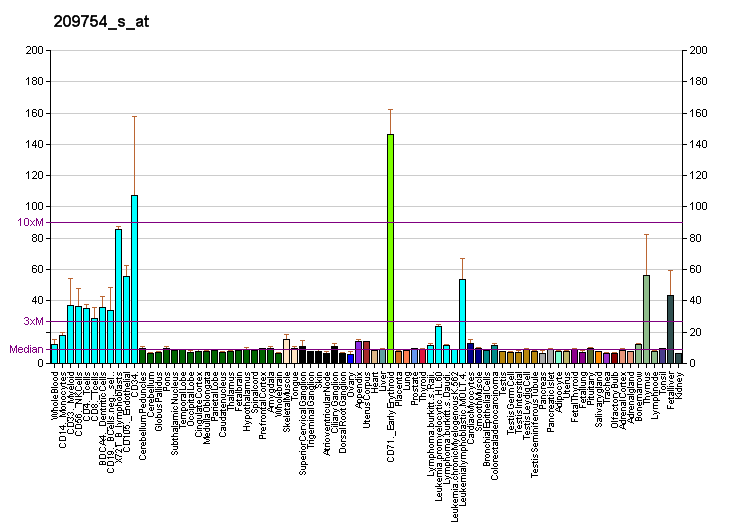
RNA expression pattern
Bgee	Human / Mouse (ortholog); Top expressed in: ventricular zone; ganglionic eminence; Achilles tendon; monocyte; trabecular bone; tonsil; lymph node; rectum; epithelium of colon; oocyte / Top expressed in: ectoderm; otic vesicle; otic placode; ventricular zone; mandibular prominence; saccule; maxillary prominence; dermis; thymus; atrium; More reference expression data
BioGPS	More reference expression data
Gene ontology
Molecular function	DNA binding; lamin binding; cadherin binding; protein binding
Cellular component	chromatin; nuclear envelope; nucleus; chromosome; cytoplasm; integral component of membrane; nuclear inner membrane; nuclear membrane; membrane
Biological process	regulation of transcription, DNA-templated
Sources:Amigo / QuickGO
Orthologs
Databases	NCBI: entry; OMA: entry
Species	Human	Mouse
Entrez	7112	21917
Ensembl	ENSG00000120802	ENSMUSG00000019961
UniProt	P42166; P42167	Q61029; Q61033
RefSeq (mRNA)	NM_001032283; NM_001032284; NM_001307975; NM_003276	NM_001080129; NM_001080130; NM_001080131; NM_001080132; NM_001080134 NM_011605; NM_001283048
RefSeq (protein)	NP_001027454; NP_001027455; NP_001294904; NP_003267; NP_001027454.1 NP_001027455.1; NP_001294904.1; NP_001027454.1	NP_001073598; NP_001073599; NP_001073600; NP_001073601; NP_001269977 NP_035735; NP_035735.2
Location (UCSC)	Chr 12: 98.52 – 98.55 Mb	Chr 10: 90.98 – 91.02 Mb
PubMed search
- Wikidata
View/Edit Human	View/Edit Mouse

Lamina-associated polypeptide 2 (LAP2), isoforms beta/gamma is a protein that in humans is encoded by the TMPO gene. LAP2 is an inner nuclear membrane (INM) protein.

Thymopoietin is a protein involved in the induction of CD90 in the thymus. The thymopoetin (TMPO) gene encodes three alternatively spliced mRNAs encoding proteins of 75 kDa (alpha), 51 kDa (beta) and 39 kDa (gamma) which are ubiquitously expressed in all cells. The human TMPO gene maps to chromosome band 12q22 and consists of eight exons. TMPO alpha is present diffusely expressed with the cell nucleus while TMPO beta and gamma are localized to the nuclear membrane. TMPO beta is a human homolog of the murine protein LAP2. LAP2 plays a role in the regulation of nuclear architecture by binding lamin B1 and chromosomes. This interaction is regulated by phosphorylation during mitosis. Given the nuclear localization of the three TMPO isoforms, it is unlikely that these proteins play any role in CD90 induction.

== Interactions ==
Thymopoietin has been shown to interact with Barrier to autointegration factor 1, AKAP8L, LMNB1 and LMNA.

== See also ==
- Thymopentin
