= GMCL1 =

Protein-coding gene in the species Homo sapiens

Identifiers
- Aliases: GMCL1, BTBD13, GCL, GCL1, SPATA29, germ cell-less, spermatogenesis associated 1, germ cell-less 1, spermatogenesis associated
- External IDs: MGI: 1345156; GeneCards: GMCL1

Gene location (Human)
Chr.	Chromosome 2 (human)
Band	2p13.3	Start	69,829,660 bp
Band	2p13.3	End	69,881,384 bp

Gene location (Mouse)
Chr.	Chromosome 6 (mouse)
Band	6 D1|6 37.75 cM	Start	86,668,750 bp
Band	6 D1|6 37.75 cM	End	86,710,365 bp
RNA expression pattern
Bgee	Human / Mouse (ortholog); Top expressed in: secondary oocyte; gonad; testicle; Achilles tendon; rectum; monocyte; islet of Langerhans; duodenum; Epithelium of choroid plexus; jejunal mucosa / Top expressed in: spermatocyte; superior cervical ganglion; seminiferous tubule; cumulus cell; molar; trigeminal ganglion; medullary collecting duct; hair follicle; primary oocyte; secondary oocyte; More reference expression data
BioGPS	n/a
Gene ontology
Molecular function	protein binding; identical protein binding
Cellular component	nuclear matrix; nuclear envelope; ubiquitin ligase complex; nucleus
Biological process	multicellular organism development; cell differentiation; regulation of transcription, DNA-templated; spermatogenesis
Sources:Amigo / QuickGO
Orthologs
Databases	NCBI: entry; OMA: entry
Species	Human	Mouse
Entrez	64395	23885
Ensembl	ENSG00000087338	ENSMUSG00000001157
UniProt	Q96IK5	Q920G9
RefSeq (mRNA)	NM_178439	NM_011818
RefSeq (protein)	NP_848526	NP_035948
Location (UCSC)	Chr 2: 69.83 – 69.88 Mb	Chr 6: 86.67 – 86.71 Mb
PubMed search
- Wikidata
View/Edit Human	View/Edit Mouse

Germ cell-less, spermatogenesis associated 1 is a protein that in humans is encoded by the GMCL1 gene.

== Function ==
This gene encodes a nuclear envelope protein that appears to be involved in spermatogenesis, either directly or by influencing genes that play a more direct role in the process. This multi-exon locus is the homolog of the mouse and drosophila germ cell-less gene but the human genome also contains a single-exon locus on chromosome 5 that contains an open reading frame capable of encoding a highly related protein.
