= Hydrops-ectopic calcification-moth-eaten skeletal dysplasia =

- Other names: Greenberg dysplasia, HEM dysplasia, autosomal recessive lethal chondrodystrophy with congenital hydrops
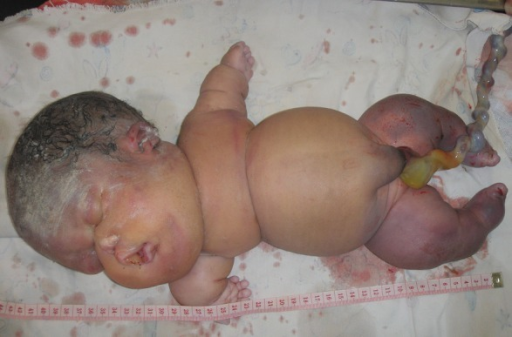
- Child with hydrops-ectopic calcification-moth-eaten skeletal dysplasia
- Specialty: Medical genetics
- Differential diagnosis: severe hydrops fetalis, phokomelia on antenatal songraphy

Hydrops-ectopic calcification-moth-eaten skeletal dysplasia is a defect in cholesterol biosynthesis. Greenberg characterized the condition in 1988.

It has been associated with the lamin B receptor.

== Signs and symptoms ==
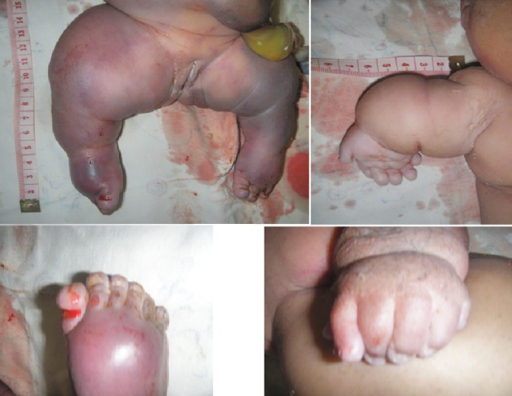
The same infant showing phocomelia (shortened limbs) and brachydactyly

Hydrops-ectopic calcification-moth-eaten skeletal dysplasia causes the bones in a fetus to develop abnormally. This leads to a characteristic "moth eaten" appearance of the bones when viewed under an X-ray. Micromelia, polydactyly and ectopic calcification, or the built up of calcium in the soft tissues of the body, may all occur. Eighty to ninety nine percent of affected individuals will have abnormally ossified vertebrae, abnormal pelvis bone ossification, anterior rib punctate calcifications and brachydactyly.

The second defining feature of hydrops-ectopic calcification-moth-eaten skeletal dysplasia is hydrops fetalis.

== See also ==
- Ectopic calcification
- Hydrops
