= Lipoatrophic diabetes =

- Specialty: Endocrinology

Lipoatrophic diabetes is a type of diabetes mellitus presenting with severe lipodystrophy in addition to the traditional signs of diabetes.

== See also ==
- Familial partial lipodystrophy
- Congenital generalized lipodystrophy
