= Restrictive dermopathy =

- Other names: Hyperkeratosis-contracture syndrome, Lethal restrictive dermopathy
- Restrictive dermopathy is inherited in an autosomal recessive manner
- Specialty: Medical genetics

Restrictive dermopathy (RD) is a rare, lethal autosomal recessive skin condition characterized by syndromic facies, tight skin, sparse or absent eyelashes, and secondary joint changes.

== Mechanism ==
Restrictive dermopathy is caused either by the loss of the gene ZMPSTE24, which encodes a protein responsible for the cleavage of farnesylated prelamin A into mature non-farnesylated lamin, or by a mutation in the LMNA gene. This results in the accumulation of farnesyl-prelamin A at the nuclear membrane. Mechanistically, restrictive dermopathy is somewhat similar to Hutchinson–Gilford progeria syndrome (HGPS), a disease where the last step in lamin processing is hindered by a mutation that causes the loss of the ZMPSTE24 cleavage site in the lamin A gene.

== See also ==
- Relapsing linear acantholytic dermatosis
- List of cutaneous conditions
- Lamellar ichthyosis – Possible differential diagnosis
