= TOR1AIP1 =

Protein-coding gene in humans

Identifiers
- Aliases: TOR1AIP1, LAP1, LAP1B, torsin 1A interacting protein 1, LGMD2Y, LAP1C
- External IDs: OMIM: 614512; MGI: 3582693; GeneCards: TOR1AIP1
Available structures
PDB	Ortholog search: PDBe RCSB
PDB	List of PDB id codes 4TVS

Gene location (Human)
Chr.	Chromosome 1 (human)
Band	1q25.2	Start	179,882,042 bp
Band	1q25.2	End	179,920,077 bp

Gene location (Mouse)
Chr.	Chromosome 1 (mouse)
Band	1|1 G3	Start	155,880,345 bp
Band	1|1 G3	End	155,912,226 bp
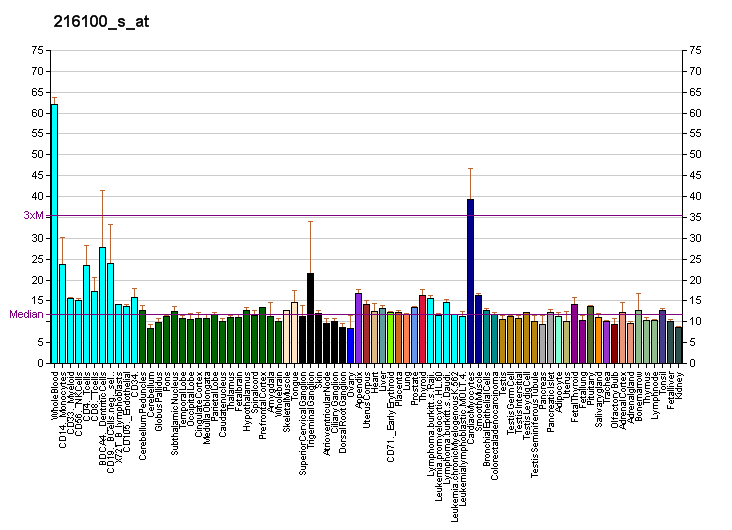

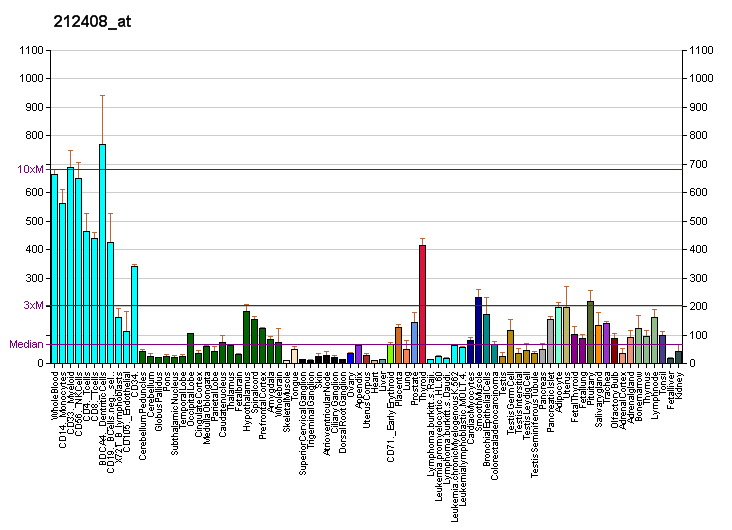

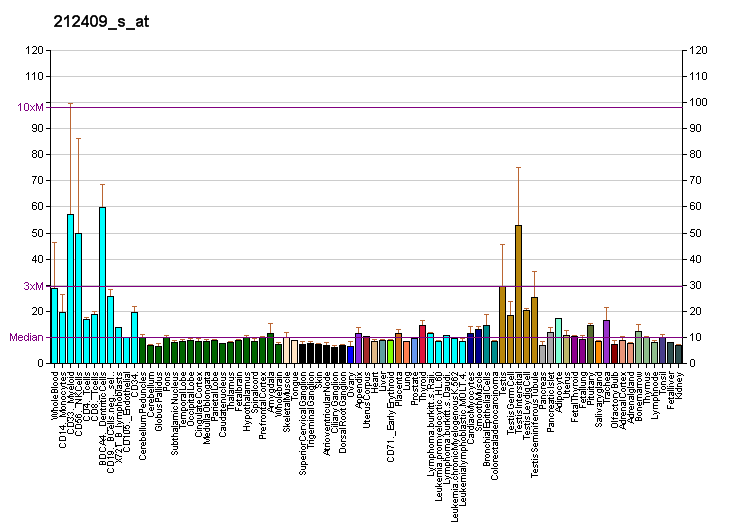
RNA expression pattern
Bgee	Human / Mouse (ortholog); Top expressed in: Epithelium of choroid plexus; urethra; Achilles tendon; Skeletal muscle tissue of rectus abdominis; tail of epididymis; caput epididymis; decidua; corpus epididymis; germinal epithelium; parietal pleura / Top expressed in: spermatid; seminiferous tubule; muscle of thigh; triceps brachii muscle; granulocyte; ankle; myocardium of ventricle; extraocular muscle; mesenteric lymph nodes; digastric muscle; More reference expression data
BioGPS	More reference expression data
Gene ontology
Molecular function	cytoskeletal protein binding; ATPase binding; ATPase activator activity; protein binding; lamin binding
Cellular component	integral component of membrane; nuclear inner membrane; nuclear envelope; membrane; nucleus; nuclear membrane
Biological process	positive regulation of ATP-dependent activity; nuclear membrane organization; protein localization to nucleus; protein localization to nuclear envelope
Sources:Amigo / QuickGO
Orthologs
Databases	NCBI: entry; OMA: entry
Species	Human	Mouse
Entrez	26092	208263
Ensembl	ENSG00000143337	ENSMUSG00000026466
UniProt	Q5JTV8	Q921T2
RefSeq (mRNA)	NM_001267578; NM_015602; NM_032678	NM_001160018; NM_001160019; NM_144791
RefSeq (protein)	NP_001254507; NP_056417	NP_001153490; NP_001153491; NP_659040; NP_001392364; NP_001392365 NP_001392366; NP_001392367
Location (UCSC)	Chr 1: 179.88 – 179.92 Mb	Chr 1: 155.88 – 155.91 Mb
PubMed search
- Wikidata
View/Edit Human	View/Edit Mouse

Torsin-1A-interacting protein 1 is a protein that in humans is encoded by the TOR1AIP1 gene. More commonly known as lamina associated polypeptide 1 (LAP1), it is a type II integral membrane protein that resides in the inner nuclear membrane. The luminal domain of LAP1 interacts with Torsin A and is necessary for the ATPase activity of Torsin A. LAP1 plays a critical role in skeletal and heart muscle. Mutations in TOR1AIP1 have been linked to muscular dystrophy and cardiomyopathy. It's deletion from mouse hepatocytes leads to defected very-low density lipoprotein secretion and causes non-alcoholic fatty liver disease and non-alcoholic steatohepatitis
