= Zinc metalloproteinase STE24 =

Enzyme

ZMPSTE24

Identifiers
- Aliases: ZMPSTE24, FACE-1, FACE1, HGPS, PRO1, STE24, Ste24p, zinc metallopeptidase STE24, RSDM1
- External IDs: OMIM: 606480; MGI: 1890508; GeneCards: ZMPSTE24
Available structures
PDB	Ortholog search: PDBe RCSB
PDB	List of PDB id codes 2YPT, 4AW6
Enzyme activity
EC #	BRENDA	ExPASy	KEGG	MetaCyc
3.4.24.84	↗	↗	↗	↗

Gene location (Human)
Chr.	Chromosome 1 (human)
Band	1p34.2	Start	40,258,041 bp
Band	1p34.2	End	40,294,180 bp

Gene location (Mouse)
Chr.	Chromosome 4 (mouse)
Band	4|4 D2.2	Start	120,916,434 bp
Band	4|4 D2.2	End	120,955,438 bp
RNA expression pattern
Bgee	Human / Mouse (ortholog); Top expressed in: hair follicle; Epithelium of choroid plexus; kidney tubule; tibia; germinal epithelium; mucosa of ileum; mucosa of sigmoid colon; right ventricle; gingival epithelium; islet of Langerhans / Top expressed in: vestibular membrane of cochlear duct; saccule; external carotid artery; internal carotid artery; otic vesicle; Epithelium of choroid plexus; otic placode; endothelial cell of lymphatic vessel; carotid body; morula; More reference expression data
BioGPS	n/a
Gene ontology
Molecular function	peptidase activity; metalloexopeptidase activity; hydrolase activity; metallopeptidase activity; metal ion binding; metalloendopeptidase activity; protein binding; double-stranded DNA binding; endopeptidase activity
Cellular component	integral component of membrane; nuclear inner membrane; extracellular exosome; endoplasmic reticulum membrane; endoplasmic reticulum; membrane; nucleus; integral component of endoplasmic reticulum membrane; nuclear envelope; protein-containing complex
Biological process	prenylated protein catabolic process; nuclear envelope organization; proteolysis; CAAX-box protein processing; liver development; hair follicle development; heart morphogenesis; ventricular cardiac muscle tissue development; cardiac ventricle development; growth plate cartilage development; DNA repair; chromatin organization; regulation of transcription, DNA-templated; inflammatory cell apoptotic process; cellular response to DNA damage stimulus; nucleus organization; regulation of mitotic cell cycle; adult walking behavior; regulation of heart contraction; determination of adult lifespan; regulation of cell shape; epidermis development; regulation of autophagy; positive regulation of gene expression; negative regulation of gene expression; regulation of glucose metabolic process; protein processing; regulation of lipid metabolic process; bone mineralization; regulation of bone mineralization; regulation of TOR signaling; regulation of hormone metabolic process; multicellular organism growth; regulation of multicellular organism growth; maintenance of rDNA; regulation of DNA damage response, signal transduction by p53 class mediator; histone H2B acetylation; histone H2B-K5 acetylation; hypomethylation of CpG island; regulation of DNA methylation; cellular lipid metabolic process; regulation of fibroblast proliferation; thymus development; regulation of defense response to virus; neuromuscular process; chromosome organization; regulation of ventricular cardiac muscle cell membrane repolarization; kidney morphogenesis; cardiac conduction; CAMKK-AMPK signaling cascade; regulation of stress-activated protein kinase signaling cascade; cellular response to gamma radiation; response to DNA damage checkpoint signaling; regulation of histone H4 acetylation; regulation of RNA polymerase II regulatory region sequence-specific DNA binding; regulation of mitotic cell cycle DNA replication; regulation of blood circulation; negative regulation of production of miRNAs involved in gene silencing by miRNA; calcium ion import into sarcoplasmic reticulum; regulation of histone H4-K16 acetylation; regulation of termination of RNA polymerase I transcription; regulation of cellular senescence
Sources:Amigo / QuickGO
Orthologs
Databases	NCBI: entry; OMA: entry
Species	Human	Mouse
Entrez	10269	230709
Ensembl	ENSG00000084073	ENSMUSG00000043207
UniProt	O75844	Q80W54
RefSeq (mRNA)	NM_005857	NM_172700
RefSeq (protein)	NP_005848	NP_766288
Location (UCSC)	Chr 1: 40.26 – 40.29 Mb	Chr 4: 120.92 – 120.96 Mb
PubMed search
- Wikidata
View/Edit Human	View/Edit Mouse

zinc metalloproteinase STE24

Identifiers
- Symbol: ZMPSTE24
- Alt. symbols: FACE1, STE24, FACE-1, Ste24p, FLJ14968
- NCBI gene: 10269
- HGNC: 12877
- OMIM: 606480
- RefSeq: NM_005857
- UniProt: O75844

Other data
- EC number: 3.4.24.84
- Locus: Chr. 1 p34
Search for
- Structures: Swiss-model
- Domains: InterPro

Zinc metalloproteinase STE24 is a metalloproteinase enzyme associated with laminopathies encoded in humans by the ZMPSTE24 gene.

Zinc metalloproteinase STE24 is involved in the processing of lamin A. Defects in the ZMPSTE24 gene lead to similar laminopathies as defects in lamin A, because the latter is a substrate for the former. In humans, a mutation abolishing the ZMPSTE24 cleavage site in prelamin A causes a progeroid disorder. Failure to correctly process prelamin A leads to deficient ability to repair DNA double-strand breaks.

As shown by Liu et al., lack of Zmpste24 prevents lamin A formation from its precursor farnesyl-prelamin A. Lack of ZMPSTE24 causes progeroid phenotypes in mice and humans. This lack increases DNA damage and chromosome aberrations and sensitivity to DNA-damaging agents that cause double-strand breaks. Also, lack of ZMPSTE24 allows an increase in non-homologous end joining, but a deficiency in steps leading to homologous recombinational DNA repair.

== See also ==
- Progeria
- Progeroid syndromes
