= Nuclear matrix =

Fibrillar network lying on nuclear membrane

In biology, the nuclear matrix is the network of fibres found throughout the inside of a cell nucleus after a specific method of chemical extraction. According to some it is somewhat analogous to the cell cytoskeleton. In contrast to the cytoskeleton, however, the nuclear matrix has been proposed to be a dynamic structure. Along with the nuclear lamina, it supposedly aids in organizing the genetic information within the cell.

The exact function of this structure is still disputed, and its very existence has been called into question. Evidence for such a structure was recognised as long ago as 1948, and consequently many proteins associated with the matrix have been discovered. The presence of intra-cellular proteins is common ground, and it is agreed that proteins such as the Scaffold, or Matrix Associated Proteins (SAR or MAR) have some role in the organisation of chromatin in the living cell. There is evidence that the nuclear matrix is involved in regulation of gene expression in Arabidopsis thaliana.

Whenever a similar structure can actually be found in living cells remains a topic of discussion. According to some sources, most, if not all proteins found in nuclear matrix are the aggregates of proteins of structures that can be found in the nucleus of living cells. Such structures are nuclear lamina, which consist of proteins termed lamins which can be also found in the nuclear matrix.

== Validity of nuclear matrix ==
For a long time the question whether a polymer meshwork, a "nuclear matrix" or "nuclear-scaffold" or "NuMat" is an essential component of the in vivo nuclear architecture has remained a matter of debate. While there are arguments that the relative position of chromosome territories (CTs), the equivalent of condensed metaphase chromosomes at interphase, may be maintained due to steric hindrance or electrostatic repulsion forces between the apparently highly structured CT surfaces, this concept has to be reconciled with observations according to which cells treated with the classical matrix-extraction procedures maintain defined territories up to the point where a minor subset of acidic nuclear matrix proteins is released – very likely those proteins that governed their association with the nuclear skeleton. The nuclear matrix proteome consists of structural proteins, chaperones, DNA/RNA-binding proteins, chromatin remodeling and transcription factors. The complexity of NuMat is an indicator of diverse structural and functional significance of its proteins.

== Scaffold/Matrix attachment regions (S/MARs) ==
S/MARs (scaffold/matrix attachment regions), the DNA regions that are known to attach genomic DNA to variety of nuclear proteins, show an ever increasing spectrum of established biological activities. There is a known overlap of this large group of sequences with sequences termed LADs (lamina attachment domains).

S/MARs find increasing use for the rational design of vectors with widespread use in gene therapy and biotechnology. Nowadays S/MAR functions can be modulated, improved and custom-tailored to the specific needs of novel vector systems.

== Nuclear matrix and cancer ==
The nuclear matrix composition on human cells has been proven to be cell type and tumor specific. It has been clearly demonstrated that the nuclear matrix composition in a tumor is different from its normal counterparts. This fact could be useful to characterize cancer markers and to predict the disease even earlier. These markers have been found in urine and blood and could potentially be used in early detection and prognosis of human cancers.

== See also ==
- Minicircle – Small, circular replicating units of DNA
