= LEM domain =

Identifiers
- Symbol: LEM
- Pfam: PF03020
- Pfam clan: CL0306
- InterPro: IPR003887
- SMART: SM00540
- PROSITE: PS50954
- CDD: cd12934
Available protein structures:
- PDB: IPR003887 PF03020 (ECOD; PDBsum)
- AlphaFold: IPR003887; PF03020

The LEM domain is a conserved protein motif found in several inner nuclear membrane proteins that contribute to the structure and function of the nucleus.
