= Lamin B receptor =

Protein found in humans

LBR
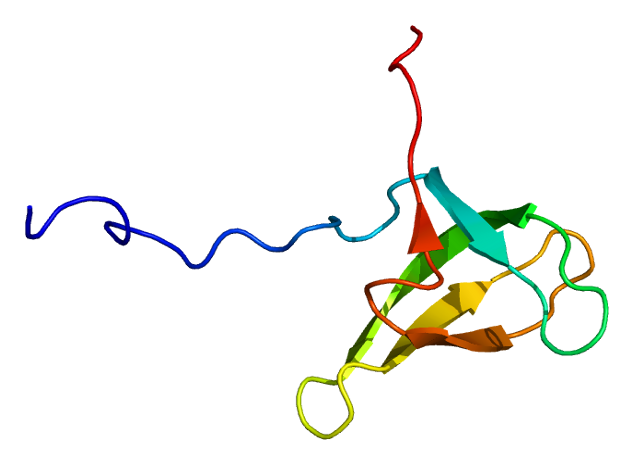

Identifiers
- Aliases: LBR, DHCR14B, LMN2R, PHA, TDRD18, lamin B receptor, PHASK, C14SR
- External IDs: OMIM: 600024; MGI: 2138281; GeneCards: LBR
Available structures
PDB	Ortholog search: C9JXK0 PDBe C9JXK0 RCSB
PDB	List of PDB id codes 2DIG
Enzyme activity
EC #	BRENDA	ExPASy	KEGG	MetaCyc
1.3.1.70	↗	↗	↗	↗

Gene location (Human)
Chr.	Chromosome 1 (human)
Band	1q42.12	Start	225,401,502 bp
Band	1q42.12	End	225,428,925 bp

Gene location (Mouse)
Chr.	Chromosome 1 (mouse)
Band	1 H5|1 84.89 cM	Start	181,642,900 bp
Band	1 H5|1 84.89 cM	End	181,670,611 bp
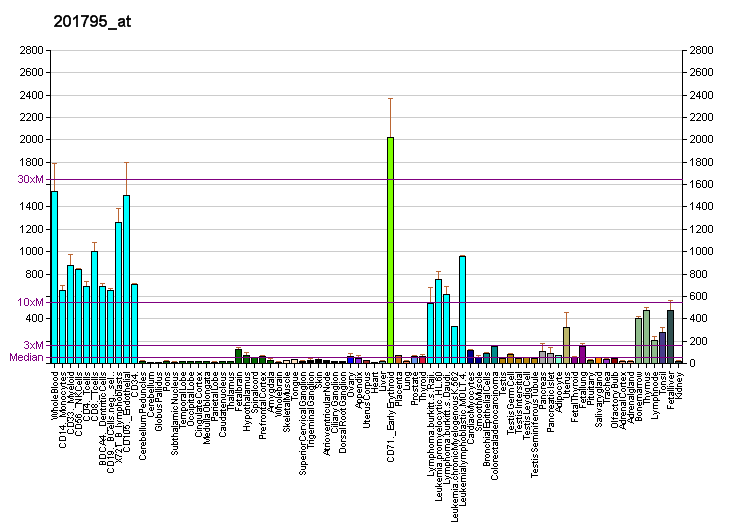
RNA expression pattern
Bgee	Human / Mouse (ortholog); Top expressed in: trabecular bone; bone marrow; thymus; bone marrow cell; ventricular zone; muscle layer of sigmoid colon; seminal vesicula; appendix; visceral pleura; mononuclear cell / Top expressed in: tibiofemoral joint; fetal liver hematopoietic progenitor cell; granulocyte; mesenteric lymph nodes; human fetus; thymus; abdominal wall; hair follicle; primitive streak; mandibular prominence; More reference expression data
BioGPS	More reference expression data
Gene ontology
Molecular function	oxidoreductase activity, acting on the CH-CH group of donors; DNA binding; oxidoreductase activity, acting on the CH-CH group of donors, NAD or NADP as acceptor; protein binding; chromo shadow domain binding; lamin binding; delta14-sterol reductase activity; RNA binding; NADPH binding; oxidoreductase activity
Cellular component	integral component of membrane; integral component of endoplasmic reticulum membrane; nuclear inner membrane; integral component of nuclear inner membrane; nuclear membrane; nuclear envelope; membrane; nucleus; cytoplasm; endoplasmic reticulum membrane; endoplasmic reticulum
Biological process	cholesterol biosynthetic process; sterol biosynthetic process; neutrophil differentiation; lipid metabolism; steroid biosynthetic process; steroid metabolic process; cholesterol metabolic process
Sources:Amigo / QuickGO
Orthologs
Databases	NCBI: entry; OMA: entry
Species	Human	Mouse
Entrez	3930	98386
Ensembl	ENSG00000143815	ENSMUSG00000004880
UniProt	Q14739	Q3U9G9
RefSeq (mRNA)	NM_002296; NM_194442	NM_133815
RefSeq (protein)	NP_002287; NP_919424	NP_598576
Location (UCSC)	Chr 1: 225.4 – 225.43 Mb	Chr 1: 181.64 – 181.67 Mb
PubMed search
- Wikidata
View/Edit Human	View/Edit Mouse

Lamin-B receptor is a protein, and in humans, it is encoded by the LBR gene.

== Function ==
The protein encoded by this gene belongs to the ERG4/ERG24 family. It localizes to the inner membrane of the nuclear envelope and anchors the lamina and the heterochromatin to the membrane. It may mediate the interaction between chromatin and lamin B. Mutations of this gene has been associated with autosomal recessive HEM/Greenberg skeletal dysplasia. Alternative splicing occurs at this locus and two transcript variants encoding the same protein have been identified.

== Clinical significance ==
There is evidence tying it to Greenberg dysplasia and Pelger–Huët anomaly.

== Interactions ==
Lamin B receptor has been shown to interact with CBX3 and CBX5. LBR also interacts with long non-coding RNA XIST in mouse cells and potentially assist the spreading XIST across X chromosome in differentiating female embryonic stem cells, but it might be redundant for correct XCI in vivo.
