= KASH domain =

Nuclear envelope localisation domain

Identifiers
- Symbol: KASH
- Pfam: PF10541
- InterPro: IPR012315
Available protein structures:
- PDB: IPR012315 PF10541 (ECOD; PDBsum)
- AlphaFold: IPR012315; PF10541

KASH domains are conserved C-terminal protein regions less than ~30 amino acids. KASH is an acronym for Klarsicht, ANC-1, Syne Homology. KASH domains always follow a transmembrane domain. Most proteins containing KASH domains are thought to be involved in the positioning of the nucleus in the cell. KASH domains interact with proteins containing SUN domains in the space between the outer and inner nuclear membranes to bridge the nuclear envelope, and may transfer force from the nucleoskeleton to the cytoplasmic cytoskeleton and enable mechanosensory roles in cells. KASH proteins are thought to largely localize to the outer nuclear membrane, although there are reports of inner nuclear membrane localization of some KASH protein isoforms.

== Examples of KASH proteins ==
Caenorhabditis elegans

- UNC-83
- ANC-1
- ZYG-12

Mammals

- Nesprins-1, 2, 3 and 4 (also called Synes, Mynes, Nuance, Enaptin)

Drosophila melanogaster

- Klarsicht
- MSP-300
