= Lamin =

Fibrous proteins

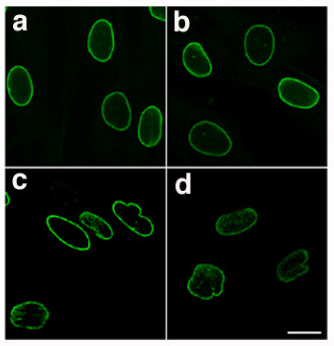
Confocal microscopic analysis of a dermal fibroblast in primary culture from a control (a and b) and the subject with HGPS (c and d). Labelling was performed with anti-lamin A/C antibodies. Note the presence of irregularly shaped nuclear envelopes in many of the subject's fibroblasts

Lamins, also known as nuclear lamins, are fibrous proteins in type V intermediate filaments, providing structural function and transcriptional regulation in the cell nucleus. Nuclear lamins interact with inner nuclear membrane proteins to form the nuclear lamina on the interior of the nuclear envelope. Lamins have elastic and mechanosensitive properties, and can alter gene regulation in a feedback response to mechanical cues. Lamins are present in all animals but are not found in microorganisms, plants or fungi. Lamin proteins are involved in the disassembling and reforming of the nuclear envelope during mitosis, the positioning of nuclear pores, and programmed cell death. Mutations in lamin genes can result in several genetic laminopathies, which may be life-threatening.

== History ==
Lamins were first identified in the cell nucleus, using electron-microscopy. However, they were not recognized as vital components of nuclear structural support until 1975. During this time period, investigations of rat liver nuclei revealed that lamins have an architectural relationship with chromatin and nuclear pores. Later in 1978, immunolabeling techniques revealed that lamins are localized at the nuclear envelope under the inner nuclear membrane. It wasn't until 1986 that an analysis of lamin cDNA clones across a variety of species supported that lamins belong to the intermediate filament (IF) protein family. Further investigations found evidence that supports that all IF proteins arose from a common lamin-like ancestor. This theory is based on the observation that organisms that contain IF proteins necessarily contain lamins as well; however, the presence of lamins is not a requirement for simultaneously containing IF proteins. Furthermore, sequence comparisons between lamins and IF proteins support that an amino-acid sequence that is characteristic of lamins is found in early forms of IF proteins. This sequence is lost in later forms of IF proteins, suggesting that the structure of later intermediate filaments diverged. After this research, investigations of lamins slowed. Studies of lamins became more popular in the 1990s when it was discovered that mutations in the genes that code for lamins can be related to muscular dystrophies, cardiomyopathies, and neuropathies. Current research is being performed to develop treatment methods for the aforementioned laminopathies and to investigate the role lamins play in the aging process.

== Structure ==
The structure of lamins is composed of three units that are common among intermediate filaments: a central α-helical rod domain containing heptad repeats surrounded by globular N and C-terminal domains. The N-terminal is shorter and located at the top (head) while the C-terminal is longer and located at the end (tail). Lamins have a unique structure of the heptad repeats that is continuous in nature and contains an additional six heptads. While the head domain of lamins is fairly consistent, the composition of the tail domain varies based on the type of lamin. However, all C-terminal domains contain a nuclear localization sequence (NLS). Similar to other IF proteins, lamins self-assemble into more complex structures. The basic unit of these structures is a coiled-coil dimer. The dimers arrange themselves in a head-to-tail manner, allowing for the formation of a protofilament. As these protofilaments aggregate, they form lamin filaments. Lamins of higher level organisms, such as vertebrates, continue to assemble into paracrystalline arrays. These complex structures allow nuclear lamins to perform their specialized functions in maintaining the shape of the nucleus as well as roles during mitosis and apoptosis.

== A- and B-types ==
Lamins are divided into two major categories: A- and B-types. These subdivisions are based on similarities in cDNA sequences, structural features, isoelectric points, and expression trends.

=== A-type lamins ===
A-type lamins are characterized by a neutral isoelectric point, and they are typically displayed during later stages of embryonic development. Expressed in differentiated cells, A-type lamins originate from the LMNA gene. Two isoforms, lamins A and C, can be created from this gene via alternative splicing. This creates a high amount of homology between the isoforms. Unlike lamin C, Lamin A is generated in a precursor form called prelamin A. Prelamin A and lamin C differ in structure only at the carboxyl-terminus. Here, prelamin A contains two extra exons that lamin C lacks. Furthermore, lamin C contains six unique amino-acid residues while prelamin A contains ninety-eight residues not found in the other isoform. A CaaX motif is found within the unique residues in prelamin A. Due to the presence of the CaaX motif, prelamin A undergoes a series of posttranslational modifications to become mature lamin A. These steps include farnesylation of the carboxyl-terminal cysteine, endoproteolytic release of the terminal amino acids, carboxymethalation of the accessible farnesylcysteine, and removal of the final fifteen residues by a zinc metalloprotease. The very first modification involving farnesylation of prelamin A is crucial to the development of mature lamin A. Isoform lamin C does not undergo posttranslational modifications. Some studies have demonstrated that lamins A and C are not required for the formation of the nuclear lamina, yet disruptions in the LMNA gene can contribute to physical and mental limitations.

=== B-type lamins ===
B-type lamins are characterized by an acidic isoelectric point, and they are typically expressed in every cell. As with A-type lamins, there are multiple isoforms of B-type lamins, the most common being lamin B1 and lamin B2. They are produced from two separate genes, LMNB1 and LMNB2. Similar to prelamin A, B-type lamins also contain a CaaX motif at the carboxyl-terminus. This marker triggers the same sequence of posttranslational modifications previously described for prelamin A except for the final cleavage step involving a zinc metalloprotease. Further investigations of B-type lamins across multiple species have found evidence that supports that B-type lamins existed before A-type lamins. This stems from the similarity in structure of B-type lamins between invertebrates and vertebrates. Furthermore, organisms that only contain a single lamin contain a B-type lamin. Other studies that have investigated the structural similarities and differences between A- and B-type lamins have found that the positions of introns/exons in B-type lamins have been conserved in A-type lamins, with more variations in the A-type lamins. This suggests that the common ancestor of these lamin types was a B-type lamin.

== Function ==
=== Maintenance of nuclear shape ===
Due to their properties as a type of IF protein, lamins provide support for maintaining the shape of the nucleus. They also play an indirect role in anchoring the nucleus to the endoplasmic reticulum, forming a continuous unit within the cell. This is accomplished by lamin and lamin-interacting proteins (SUN1/SUN2) connecting with proteins on the outer nuclear membrane. These proteins in turn interact with cytoskeletal elements of the endoplasmic reticulum, forming a strong complex that can withstand mechanical stress. Nuclei that lack lamins or have mutated versions have a deformed shape and do not function properly.

=== Mitosis ===
During mitosis, lamins are phosphorylated by the mitosis-promoting factor (MPF), which drives the disassembly of the lamina and the nuclear envelope. This allows chromatin to condense and the DNA to be replicated. After chromosome segregation, dephosphorylation of nuclear lamins by a phosphatase promotes reassembly of the nuclear envelope.

=== Apoptosis ===
Apoptosis is a highly organized process of programmed cell death. Lamins are crucial targets for this process due to their close associations with chromatin and the nuclear envelope. Apoptotic enzymes called caspases target lamins and cleave both A- and B-types. This allows chromatin to separate from the nuclear lamina in order to be condensed. As apoptosis continues, cell structures slowly shrink into compartmentalized "blebs." Finally, these apoptotic bodies are digested by phagocytes. Studies of apoptosis involving mutant A- and B-type lamins that are resistant to cleavage by caspases show decreased DNA condensation and apoptotic "blebbing" formation, thereby underscoring the important role of lamins in apoptosis.

DNA repair

Lamins are implicated in repair of DNA double-strand breaks through homologous recombination. A small molecule ligand LBL1 was identified to bind lamins. LBL1 was shown to disrupt the interaction between lamin A and DNA recombinase Rad51 and induce degradation of Rad51 through ubiquitin-proteasome pathway.

== Clinical significance ==
Mutations in the LMNA gene, encoding Lamins A and C, can produce a series of disorders ranging from muscular dystrophies, neuropathies, cardiomyopathies, and premature ageing syndromes. Collectively, these conditions are known as laminopathies.

=== Hutchinson-Gilford progeria syndrome ===
One specific laminopathy is Hutchinson-Gilford progeria syndrome (HGPS), characterized by premature ageing. Those affected by the condition appear normal at birth, but show signs of premature ageing including hair-loss, thinness, joint abnormalities, and weak motor skills as they develop. Furthermore, health problems usually seen in older persons such as atherosclerosis and high blood pressure occur at a much younger age. Those with HGPS typically die in their early teens, usually following a heart attack or stroke.

HGPS is caused by a point mutation in the LMNA gene that codes for lamin A. The genetic alteration results in an alternative splice, creating a mutated form of prelamin A that is much shorter and lacks the cleavage site for a zinc metalloprotease. Because prelamin A cannot be properly processed during posttranslational modifications, it retains its lipid modification (farnesylation) and remains in the inner nuclear membrane. This disrupts the mechanical stability of the nucleus, resulting in a higher rate of cell death and therefore a higher rate of aging. Current studies are investigating the effects of farnesyl-transferase inhibitors (FTIs) to see if farnesyl attachment can be inhibited during posttranslational modification of prelamin A in order to treat patients with HGPS.

=== Lamin A/C heart disease ===
Some laminopathies affect heart muscle. These mutations cause a spectrum of heart disease ranging from no apparent effect to severe dilated cardiomyopathy leading to heart failure. Laminopathies frequently cause heart rhythm problems at an early stage in the disease process including abnormally slow heart rhythms such as sinus node dysfunction and atrioventricular block, and abnormally rapid heart rhythms such as ventricular tachycardia. As a result, those with Lamin A/C heart disease are often treated with pacemakers or implantable defibrillators in addition to medication.
