= Pelger–Huët anomaly =

- Other names: PHA
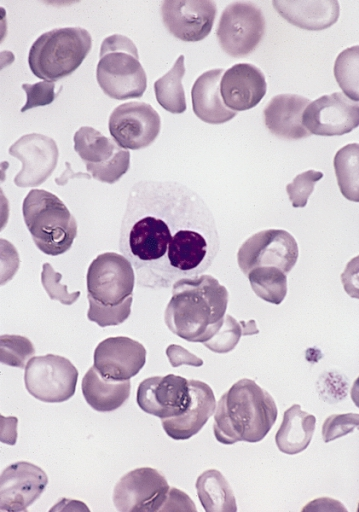
- Blood smear of a patient with myelodysplastic syndrome: red blood cells showing marked poikilocytosis, in part related to post-splenectomy status, a central and hypogranular neutrophil with a pseudo-Pelger–Huët anomaly
- Pronunciation: English: /ˈpɛlɡər ˈhuːɛt/ PEL-ghər HOO-ət Dutch: [ˈpɛlɣər ˈɦuːɛt]
- Specialty: Medical genetics

Pelger–Huët anomaly is a blood laminopathy associated with the lamin B receptor, wherein several types of white blood cells (neutrophils and eosinophils) have nuclei with unusual shape (being bilobed, peanut or dumbbell-shaped instead of the normal trilobed shape) and unusual structure (coarse and lumpy).

Pelger–Huët anomaly has an autosomal dominant pattern of inheritance.

It is a genetic disorder with an autosomal dominant inheritance pattern. Heterozygotes are clinically normal, although their neutrophils may be mistaken for immature cells which may cause mistreatment in a clinical setting. Homozygotes tend to have neutrophils with rounded nuclei that do have some functional problems.

== Congenital Pelger–Huët anomaly ==
Is a benign dominantly inherited defect of terminal neutrophil differentiation as a result of mutations in the lamin B receptor gene. The characteristic leukocyte appearance was first reported in 1928 by Karel Pelger (1885–1931), a Dutch Hematologist, who described leukocytes with dumbbell-shaped bilobed nuclei, a reduced number of nuclear segments, and coarse clumping of the nuclear chromatin. In 1931, Gauthier Jean Huet (1879–1970), a Dutch Pediatrician, identified it as an inherited disorder.

It is a genetic disorder with an autosomal dominant inheritance pattern. Heterozygotes are clinically normal, although their neutrophils may be mistaken for immature cells, which may cause mistreatment in a clinical setting. Homozygotes tend to have neutrophils with rounded nuclei that do have some functional problems. Homozygous individuals inconsistently have skeletal anomalies such as post-axial polydactyly, short metacarpals, short upper limbs, short stature, or hyperkyphosis.

Identifying Pelger–Huët anomaly is important to differentiate from bandemia with a left-shifted peripheral blood smear and neutrophilic band forms and from an increase in young neutrophilic forms that can be observed in association with infection.

== Acquired or pseudo-Pelger–Huët anomaly ==
Anomalies resembling Pelger–Huët anomaly that are acquired rather than congenital have been described as pseudo Pelger–Huët anomaly. These can develop in the course of acute myelogenous leukemia or chronic myelogenous leukemia and in myelodysplastic syndrome. It has also been described in Filovirus disease.

In patients with these conditions, the pseudo–Pelger–Huët cells tend to appear late in the disease and often appear after considerable chemotherapy has been administered. The morphologic changes have also been described in myxedema associated with panhypopituitarism, vitamin B_{12} and folate deficiency, multiple myeloma, enteroviral infections, malaria, muscular dystrophy, leukemoid reaction secondary to metastases to the bone marrow, and drug sensitivity, sulfa and valproate toxicities are examples. In some of these conditions, especially the drug-induced cases, it is important to differentiate between Pelger–Huët anomaly and pseudo-Pelger–Huët to prevent the need for further unnecessary testing for cancer.

Peripheral blood smear shows a predominance of neutrophils with bilobed nuclei which are composed of two nuclear masses connected with a thin filament of chromatin. It resembles the pince-nez glasses, so it is often referred to as pince-nez appearance. Usually the congenital form is not associated with thrombocytopenia and leukopenia, so if these features are present more detailed search for myelodysplasia is warranted, as pseudo-Pelger–Huët anomaly can be an early feature of myelodysplasia.

In 2022, Reilly et al. showed that loss of LMNB1, the gene encoding lamin B1, is necessary and sufficient to cause pseudo-Pelger–Huët anomaly in neutrophils. Myeloid malignancies with pseudo-Pelger–Huët neutrophils typically have deletion of chromosome 5q, which contains the LMNB1 gene.
