= Nuclear envelope =

Nuclear membrane surrounding the nucleus in eukaryotic cells

- Human cell nucleus

Identifiers
- TH: H1.00.01.2.01001
- FMA: 63888

The nuclear envelope, also known as the nuclear membrane, (Note: Less used names include nucleolemma and karyotheca.) is made up of two lipid bilayer membranes that in eukaryotic cells surround the nucleus, which encloses the genetic material.

The nuclear envelope consists of two lipid bilayer membranes: an inner nuclear membrane and an outer nuclear membrane. The space between the membranes is called the perinuclear space. It is usually about 10–50 nm wide. The outer nuclear membrane is continuous with the endoplasmic reticulum membrane. The nuclear envelope has many nuclear pores that allow materials to move between the cytosol and the nucleus. Intermediate filament proteins called lamins form a structure called the nuclear lamina on the inner aspect of the inner nuclear membrane and give structural support to the nucleus.

== Structure ==
The nuclear envelope is made up of two lipid bilayer membranes, an inner nuclear membrane and an outer nuclear membrane. These membranes are connected to each other by nuclear pores. Two sets of intermediate filaments provide support for the nuclear envelope. An internal network forms the nuclear lamina on the inner nuclear membrane. A looser network forms outside to give external support. The actual shape of the nuclear envelope is irregular. It has invaginations and protrusions and can be observed with an electron microscope.

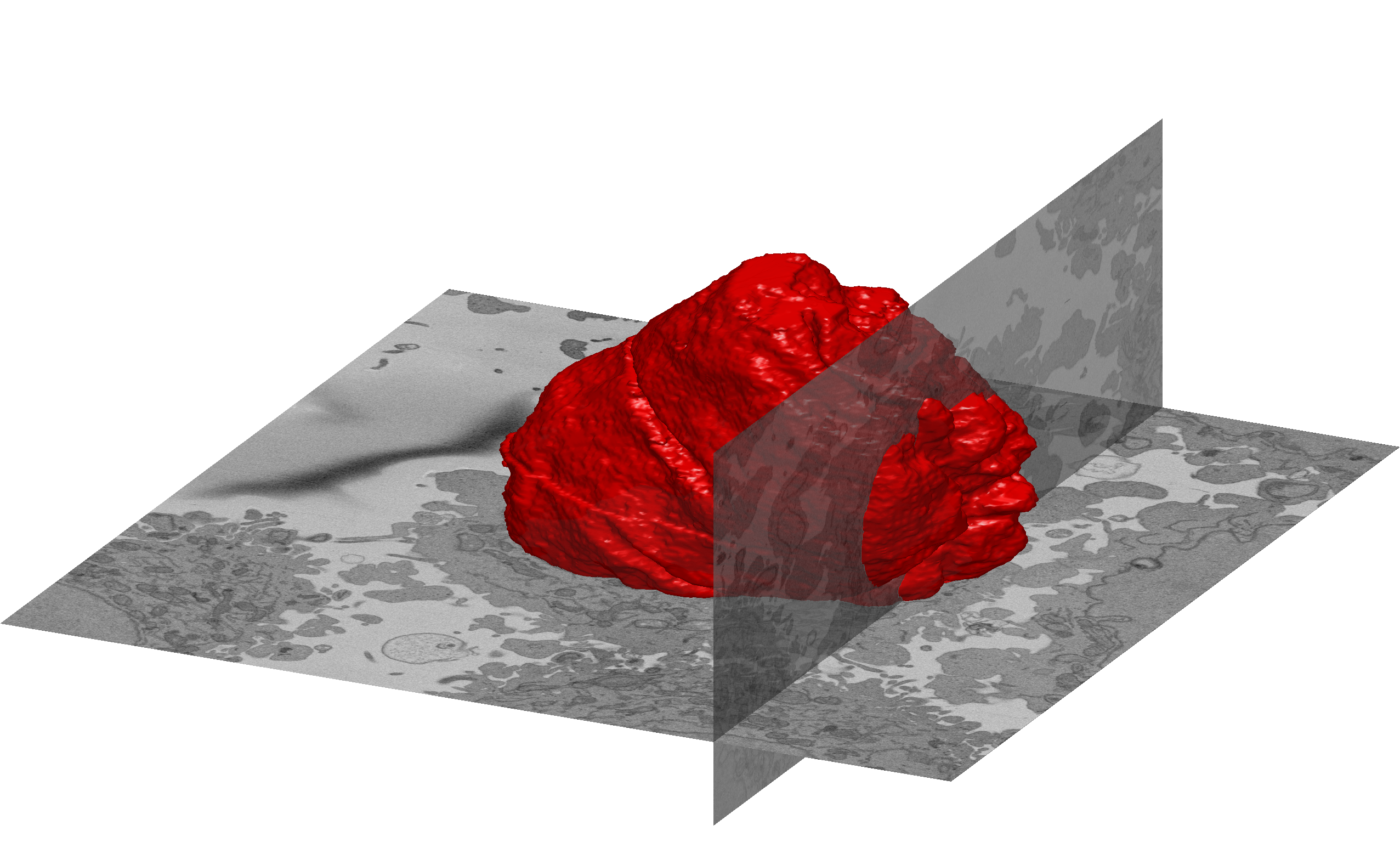
A volumetric surface render (red) of the nuclear envelope of one HeLa cell. The cell was observed in 300 slices of electron microscopy, the nuclear envelope was automatically segmented and rendered. One vertical and one horizontal slice are added for reference.

=== Outer membrane ===
The outer nuclear membrane also shares a common border with the endoplasmic reticulum. While it is physically linked, the outer nuclear membrane contains proteins found in far higher concentrations than the endoplasmic reticulum. All four nesprin proteins (nuclear envelope spectrin repeat proteins) present in mammals are expressed in the outer nuclear membrane. Nesprin proteins connect cytoskeletal filaments to the nucleoskeleton. Nesprin-mediated connections to the cytoskeleton contribute to nuclear positioning and to the cell's mechanosensory function. KASH domain proteins of Nesprin-1 and -2 are part of a LINC complex (linker of nucleoskeleton and cytoskeleton) and can bind directly to cytoskeletal components, such as actin filaments, or can bind to proteins in the perinuclear space. Nesprin-3 and -4 may play a role in unloading enormous cargo; Nesprin-3 proteins bind plectin and link the nuclear envelope to cytoplasmic intermediate filaments. Nesprin-4 proteins bind the plus end directed motor kinesin-1. The outer nuclear membrane is also involved in development, as it fuses with the inner nuclear membrane to form nuclear pores.

=== Inner membrane ===
The inner nuclear membrane encloses the nucleoplasm, and is covered by the nuclear lamina, a mesh of intermediate filaments which stabilizes the nuclear membrane as well as being involved in chromatin function. It is connected to the outer membrane by nuclear pores which penetrate the membranes. While the two membranes and the endoplasmic reticulum are linked, proteins embedded in the membranes tend to stay put rather than dispersing across the continuum. It is lined with a fiber network called the nuclear lamina which is 10-40 nm thick and provides strength.

Mutations in the genes that encode for the inner nuclear membrane proteins can cause several laminopathies.

=== Nuclear pores ===
Nuclear pores crossing the nuclear envelope

The nuclear envelope is punctured by around a thousand nuclear pore complexes, about 100 nm across, with an inner channel about 40 nm wide. The complexes contain a number of nucleoporins, proteins that link the inner and outer nuclear membranes.

== Cell division ==
During the G2 phase of interphase, the nuclear membrane increases its surface area and doubles its number of nuclear pore complexes. In eukaryotes such as yeast which undergo closed mitosis, the nuclear membrane stays intact during cell division. The spindle fibers either form within the membrane, or penetrate it without tearing it apart. In other eukaryotes (animals as well as plants), the nuclear membrane must break down during the prometaphase stage of mitosis to allow the mitotic spindle fibers to access the chromosomes inside. The breakdown and reformation processes are not well understood.

=== Breakdown ===
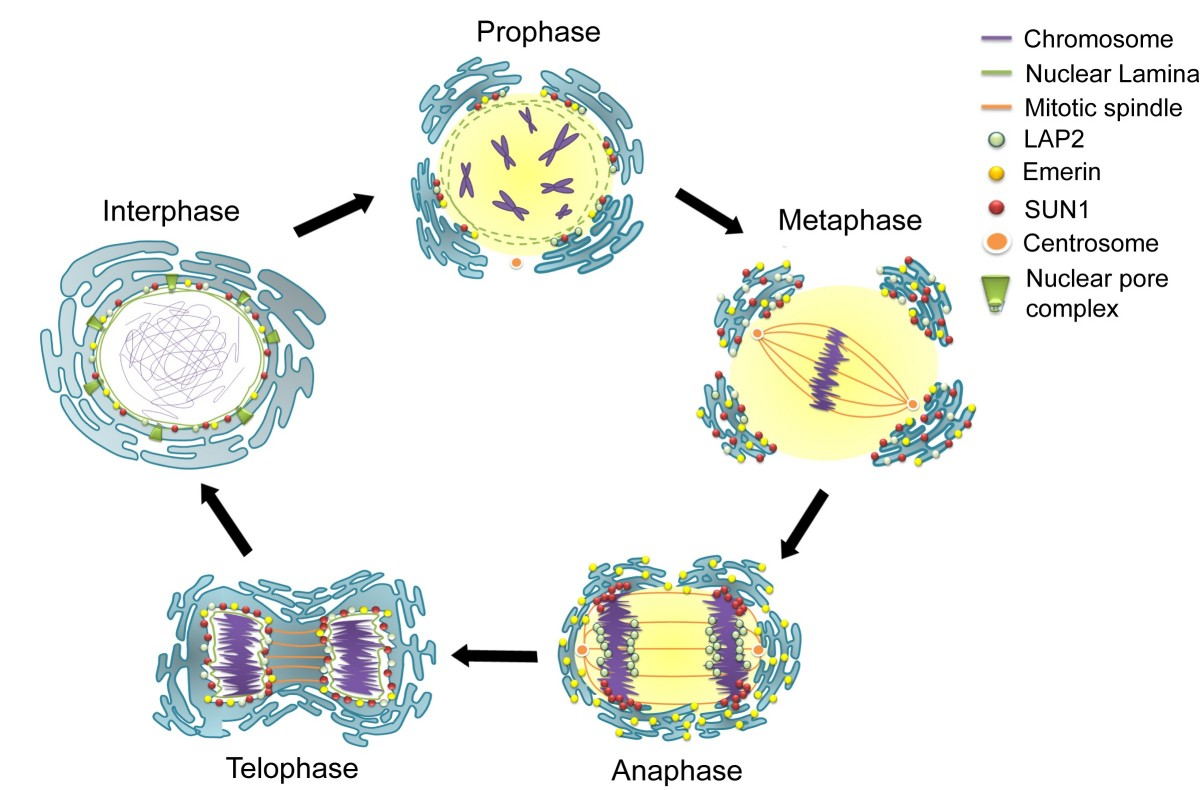
Breakdown and reassembly in mitosis

In mammals, the nuclear membrane can break down within minutes, following a set of steps during the early stages of mitosis. First, M-Cdk's phosphorylate nucleoporin polypeptides and they are selectively removed from the nuclear pore complexes. After that, the rest of the nuclear pore complexes break apart simultaneously. Biochemical evidence suggests that the nuclear pore complexes disassemble into stable pieces rather than disintegrating into small polypeptide fragments. M-Cdk's also phosphorylate elements of the nuclear lamina (the framework that supports the envelope) leading to the disassembly of the lamina and hence the envelope membranes into small vesicles. Electron and fluorescence microscopy has given strong evidence that the nuclear membrane is absorbed by the endoplasmic reticulum—nuclear proteins not normally found in the endoplasmic reticulum show up during mitosis.

In addition to the breakdown of the nuclear membrane during the prometaphase stage of mitosis, the nuclear membrane also ruptures in migrating mammalian cells during the interphase stage of the cell cycle. This transient rupture is likely caused by nuclear deformation. The rupture is rapidly repaired by a process dependent on "endosomal sorting complexes required for transport" (ESCRT) made up of cytosolic protein complexes. During nuclear membrane rupture events, DNA double-strand breaks occur. Thus the survival of cells migrating through confined environments appears to depend on efficient nuclear envelope and DNA repair machineries.

Aberrant nuclear envelope breakdown has also been observed in laminopathies and in cancer cells leading to mislocalization of cellular proteins, the formation of micronuclei and genomic instability.

=== Reformation ===
Exactly how the nuclear membrane reforms during telophase of mitosis is debated. Two theories exist—

- Vesicle fusion — where vesicles of nuclear membrane fuse together to rebuild the nuclear membrane
- Re-shaping of the endoplasmic reticulum—where the parts of the endoplasmic reticulum containing the absorbed nuclear membrane envelop the nuclear space, reforming a closed membrane.

== Origin of the nuclear membrane ==
A study of the comparative genomics, evolution and origins of the nuclear membrane led to the proposal that the nucleus emerged in the primitive eukaryotic ancestor (the "prekaryote"), and was triggered by the archaeo-bacterial symbiosis. Several ideas have been proposed for the evolutionary origin of the nuclear membrane. These ideas include the invagination of the plasma membrane in a prokaryote ancestor, or the formation of a genuine new membrane system following the establishment of proto-mitochondria in the archaeal host. The adaptive function of the nuclear membrane may have been to serve as a barrier to protect the genome from reactive oxygen species (ROS) produced by the cells' pre-mitochondria.
