= Lizzie Velásquez =

American motivational speaker and YouTuber (born 1989)

Lizzie Velasquez
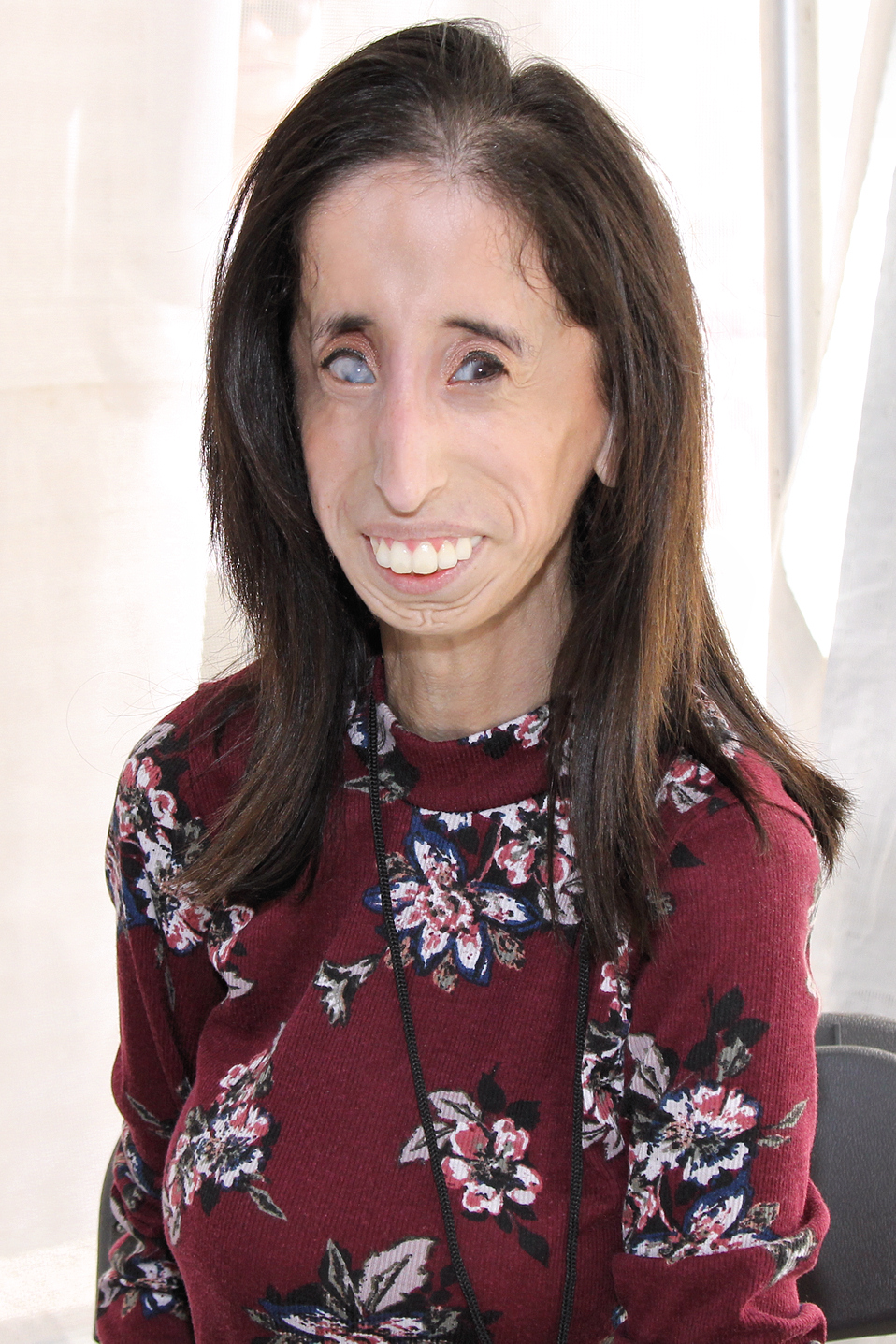
- Velásquez at the 2017 Texas Book Festival
- Born: Elizabeth Ann Velásquez; March 13, 1989 (age 37); Austin, Texas, U.S.
- Education: Texas State University
- Occupation: Motivational speaker
- Known for: Public speaking, anti-bullying activism, public appearances, and book authorship

Elizabeth Anne Velásquez (/ˈlɪ.zi və.ˈlæs.kɛz/; born March 13, 1989) is an American motivational speaker, activist, writer, and YouTuber. She was born with an extremely rare congenital disease, Marfanoid–progeroid–lipodystrophy syndrome, which, among other symptoms, prevents her from accumulating body fat and gaining weight. Her conditions resulted in bullying during her childhood. During her teenage years, she faced cyberbullying, which ultimately inspired her to take up motivational speaking.

== Early life ==
The eldest of three children born to Rita and Guadalupe Velásquez, Lizzie was born on March 13, 1989, in Austin, Texas. She was born four weeks prematurely and weighed less than 2 pounds 11 ounces (1,219 grams).

Velásquez studied at Texas State University until late 2012, majoring in communication studies. She is a Roman Catholic and has said of her faith, "It's been my rock through everything, just having the time to be alone and pray and talk to God and know that He's there for me."

== Condition ==
Velásquez's condition is an extremely rare, non-terminal genetic disorder. Her condition bears similarities to many other conditions, especially progeria. Medical researchers at the University of Texas Southwestern Medical Center previously speculated that it might be a form of neonatal progeroid syndrome (NPS) (Wiedemann-Rautenstrauch syndrome), which does not affect Velásquez's bones, organs, or teeth.

Velásquez cannot gain weight, which is a hallmark of her extremely rare disorder. She has never weighed more than 29 kg (64 lbs), and reportedly has almost 0% body fat. Moreover, she must eat many small meals and snacks throughout the day, averaging between 5,000 and 8,000 calories daily. Additionally, she is blind in her right eye, which began to cloud over when she was four; vision is impaired in her left eye.

Around 2015, it was revealed that Velásquez and another woman, Abby Solomon, with a less severe variant of the condition, have mutations in the FBN1 gene, which encodes the proprotein of the novel hormone asprosin, and that this mutation results in asprosin deficiency and is responsible for their conditions. The condition is specifically called Marfanoid-progeroid-lipodystrophy syndrome, or simply Marfan lipodystrophy syndrome.

== Career ==
Ever since she was dubbed the "World's Ugliest Woman" in a video posted on YouTube in 2006, when she was 17, Velásquez has spoken out against bullying. In January 2014, she gave a TEDxAustinWomen Talk titled "How Do YOU Define Yourself", and her YouTube videos have received over 54 million views. She is known for her optimism. For National Bullying Prevention Month in 2015, she hosted a social media challenge for Bystander Revolution's Month of Action.

Her first work, co-authored with her mother, Rita, is a self-published autobiography published in 2010 in English and Spanish. It is called Lizzie Beautiful: The Lizzie Velásquez Story, and includes letters Velásquez's mother wrote to her as a child.

Velásquez has also written two books directed at kids, which share personal stories and offer advice. Be Beautiful, Be You (2012) shares her journey "to discover what truly makes us beautiful, and teaches readers to recognize their unique gifts and blessings". The book is also available in Spanish as Sé bella, sé tú misma (2013). Another book, Choosing Happiness (2014), talks about some of the obstacles Velásquez has faced and how she "learned the importance of choosing to be happy when it's all too easy to give up". Both books were published by Liguori Publications, a Redemptorist publishing house.

Dare to Be Kind, first published in 2017, is about the importance of being kind, gleaned from her firsthand experience being bullied, both personally and online.

In 2015, Velásquez was the subject of the documentary A Brave Heart: The Lizzie Velasquez Story, directed and produced by Sara Hirsh Bordo. The film premiered at the SXSW Film Festival on March 14, 2015, where it won the Audience Award for Documentary Spotlight. The documentary aired on Lifetime on October 17, 2016.

Velásquezc has starred on her own Fullscreen original series titled Unzipped since April 2017.

== See also ==
- Hayley Okines — English girl who had progeria and was the subject of television specials both in Europe and in the United States.
- Sam Berns — American male with progeria who was the only child of the doctors who established the Progeria Research Foundation.
