= Progeroid syndromes =

Range of genetic disorders which cause a person to appear to grow older faster

Progeroid syndromes (PS) are a group of rare genetic disorders that mimic physiological aging, making affected individuals appear to be older than they are. The term progeroid syndrome does not necessarily imply progeria (Hutchinson–Gilford progeria syndrome), which is a specific type of progeroid syndrome.

Progeroid means "resembling premature aging", a definition that can apply to a broad range of diseases. Familial Alzheimer's disease and familial Parkinson's disease are two well-known accelerated-aging diseases that are more frequent in older individuals. They affect only one tissue and can be classified as unimodal progeroid syndromes. Segmental progeria, which is more frequently associated with the term progeroid syndrome, tends to affect multiple or all tissues while causing affected individuals to exhibit only some of the features associated with aging.

All disorders within this group are thought to be monogenic, meaning they arise from mutations of a single gene. Most known PS are due to genetic mutations that lead to either defects in the DNA repair mechanism or defects in lamin A/C.

Examples of PS include Werner syndrome (WS), Bloom syndrome (BS), Rothmund–Thomson syndrome (RTS), Cockayne syndrome (CS), xeroderma pigmentosum (XP), trichothiodystrophy (TTD), combined xeroderma pigmentosum-Cockayne syndrome (XP-CS), restrictive dermopathy (RD), and Hutchinson–Gilford progeria syndrome (HGPS). Individuals with these disorders tend to have a reduced lifespan. Progeroid syndromes have been widely studied in the fields of aging, regeneration, stem cells, and cancer. The most widely studied of the progeroid syndromes are Werner syndrome and Hutchinson–Gilford progeria, as they are seen to most resemble natural aging.

== Defects in DNA repair ==
One of the main causes of progeroid syndromes are genetic mutations, which lead to defects in the cellular processes which repair DNA. The DNA damage theory of aging proposes that aging is a consequence of the accumulation of naturally occurring DNA damages. The accumulated damage may arise from reactive oxygen species (ROS), chemical reactions (e.g. with intercalating agents), radiation, depurination, and deamination.

Mutations in three classes of DNA repair proteins, RecQ protein-like helicases (RECQLs), nucleotide excision repair (NER) proteins, and nuclear envelope proteins LMNA (lamins) have been associated with the following progeroid syndromes:

- Werner syndrome (WS)
- Bloom syndrome (BS)
- Rothmund–Thomson syndrome (RTS)
- Cockayne syndrome (CS)
- Xeroderma pigmentosum (XP)
- Trichothiodystrophy (TTD)

=== RecQ-associated PS ===
RecQ is a family of conserved ATP-dependent helicases required for repairing DNA and preventing deleterious recombination and genomic instability. DNA helicases are enzymes that bind to double-stranded DNA and temporarily separate them. This unwinding is required during replication of the genome under mitosis, but in the context of PS, it is a required step in repairing damaged DNA. Thus, DNA helicases, maintain the integrity of a cell, and defects in these helicases are linked to an increased predisposition to cancer and aging phenotypes. Thus, individuals with RecQ-associated PS show an increased risk of developing cancer, which is caused by genomic instability and increased rates of mutation.

There are five genes encoding RecQ in humans (RECQ1-5), and defects in RECQL2/WRN, RECQL3/BLM and RECQL4 lead to Werner syndrome (WS), Bloom syndrome (BS), and Rothmund–Thomson syndrome (RTS), respectively. On the cellular level, cells of affected individuals exhibit chromosomal abnormalities, genomic instability, and sensitivity to mutagens.

==== Werner syndrome ====
Werner syndrome is inherited in an autosomal recessive manner, which means both parents must contribute a dysfunctional allele for an individual to develop the disease.

Werner syndrome (WS) is a rare autosomal recessive disorder. It has a global incidence rate of less than 1 in 100,000 live births, although incidences in Japan and Sardinia are higher, where it affects 1 in 20,000-40,000 and 1 in 50,000, respectively. As of 2006, there were approximately 1,300 reported cases of WS worldwide. Affected individuals typically grow and develop normally until puberty, when they do not experience the typical adolescent growth spurt. The mean age of diagnosis is twenty-four. The median and mean age of death are 47-48 and 54 years, respectively; the main cause of death is cardiovascular disease or cancer.

Affected individuals can exhibit slower growth, short stature, premature graying of hair, hair loss, wrinkling, prematurely aged faces, beaked noses, skin atrophy with scleroderma-like lesions, loss of fat tissues, abnormal fat deposition leading to thin legs and arms, and severe ulcerations around the Achilles tendon and malleoli. Other signs include change in voice, making it weak, hoarse, or high-pitched; atrophy of gonads, leading to reduced fertility; bilateral cataracts (clouding of lens); premature arteriosclerosis (thickening and loss of elasticity of arteries); calcinosis (calcium deposits in blood vessels); atherosclerosis (blockage of blood vessels); type 2 diabetes; loss of bone mass; telangiectasia; and malignancies. In fact, the prevalence of rare cancers, such as meningiomas, are increased in individuals with Werner syndrome.

Approximately 90% of individuals with Werner Syndrome have any of a range of mutations in the eponymous gene, WRN, the only gene currently connected to Werner syndrome. WRN encodes the WRNp protein, a 1432 amino acid protein with a central domain resembling members of the RecQ helicases. WRNp is active in unwinding DNA, a step necessary in DNA repair and DNA replication. Since WRNp's function depends on DNA, it is only functional when localized to the nucleus.

Mutations that cause Werner syndrome only occur at the regions of the gene that encode for protein and not at non-coding regions. These mutations can have a range of effects. They may decrease the stability of the transcribed messenger RNA (mRNA), which increases the rate at which they are degraded. With fewer mRNA, fewer are available to be translated into the WRNp protein. Mutations may also lead to the truncation (shortening) of the WRNp protein, leading to the loss of its nuclear localization signal sequence, which would normally transport it to the nucleus where it can interact with the DNA. This leads to a reduction in DNA repair. Furthermore, mutated proteins are more likely to be degraded than normal WRNp. Apart from causing defects in DNA repair, its aberrant association with p53 down-regulates the function of p53, leading to a reduction in p53-dependent apoptosis and increase the survival of these dysfunctional cells.

Cells of affected individuals have reduced lifespan in culture, more chromosome breaks and translocations and extensive deletions. These DNA damages, chromosome aberrations and mutations may in turn cause more RecQ-independent aging phenotypes.

==== Bloom syndrome ====
Bloom syndrome (BS) is a very rare autosomal recessive disorder. Incidence rates are unknown, although it is known to be higher in people of Ashkenazi Jewish background, presenting in around 1 in 50,000. Approximately one-third of individuals who have BS are of Ashkenazi Jewish descent.

There is no evidence from the Bloom's Syndrome Registry or from the peer-reviewed medical literature that BS is a progeroid condition associated with advanced aging. It is, however, associated with early-onset cancer and adult-type diabetes and also with Werner syndrome, which is a progeroid syndrome, through mutation in the RecQ helicases. These associations have led to the speculation that BS could be associated with aging. Unfortunately, the average lifespan of persons with Bloom syndrome is 27 years; consequently, there is insufficient information to completely rule out the possibility that BS is associated with some features of aging.

People with BS start their life with a low weight and length when they are born. Even as adults, they typically remain under 5 feet (1.5 m) tall. Individuals with BS are characterized by low weight and height and abnormal facial features, particularly a long, narrow face with a small lower jaw, a large nose and prominent ears. Most also develop photosensitivity, which causes the blood vessels to be dilated and leads to reddening of the skin, usually presented as a "butterfly-shaped patch of reddened skin across the nose and cheeks". Other characteristics of BS include learning disabilities, an increased risk of diabetes, gastroesophageal reflux (GER), and chronic obstructive pulmonary disease (COPD). GER may also lead to recurrent infections of the upper respiratory tract, ears, and lungs during infancy. BS causes infertility in males and reduced fertility and early-onset menopause in females. In line with any RecQ-associated PS, people with BS have an increased risk of developing cancer, often more than one type.

BS is caused by mutations in the BLM gene, which encodes for the Bloom syndrome protein, a RecQ helicase. These mutations may be frameshift, missense, non-sense, or mutations of other kinds and are likely to cause deletions in the gene product. Apart from helicase activity that is common to all RecQ helices, it also acts to prevent inappropriate homologous recombination. During replication of the genome, the two copies of DNA, called sister chromatids, are held together through a structure called the centromere. During this time, the homologous (corresponding) copies are in close physical proximity to each other, allowing them to 'cross' and exchange genetic information, a process called homologous recombination. Defective homologous recombination can cause mutation and genetic instability. Such defective recombination can introduce gaps and breaks within the genome and disrupt the function of genes, possibly causing slower growth, aging and elevated risk of cancer. It introduces gaps and breaks within the genome and disrupts the function of genes, often causing slower growth, aging and elevated risks of cancers. The Bloom syndrome protein interacts with other proteins, such as topoisomerase IIIα and RMI2, and suppresses illegitimate recombination events between sequences that are divergent from strict homology, thus maintaining genome stability. Individuals with BS have a loss-of-function mutation, which means that the illegitimate recombination is no longer suppressed, leading to higher rates of mutation (~10-100 times above normal, depending on cell type).

=== NER protein-associated PS ===
Nucleotide excision repair is a DNA repair mechanism. There are three excision repair pathways: nucleotide excision repair (NER), base excision repair (BER), and DNA mismatch repair (MMR). In NER, the damaged DNA strand is removed and the undamaged strand is kept as a template for the formation of a complementary sequence with DNA polymerase. DNA ligase joins the strands together to form dsDNA. There are two subpathways for NER, which differ only in their mechanism for recognition: global genomic NER (GG-NER) and transcription coupled NER (TC-NER).

Defects in the NER pathway have been linked to progeroid syndromes. There are 28 genes in this pathway. Individuals with defects in these genes often have developmental defects and exhibit neurodegeneration. They can also develop CS, XP, and TTD, often in combination with each other, as with combined xeroderma pigmentosa-Cockayne syndrome (XP-CS). Variants of these diseases, such as DeSanctis–Cacchione syndrome and Cerebro-oculo-facio-skeletal (COFS) syndrome, can also be caused by defects in the NER pathway. However, unlike RecQ-associated PS, not all individuals affected by these diseases have increased risk of cancer. All these disorders can be caused by mutations in a single gene, XPD, or in other genes.

==== Cockayne syndrome ====
Cockayne syndrome (CS) is a rare autosomal recessive PS. There are three types of CS, distinguished by severity and age of onset. It occurs at a rate of about 1 in 300,000-500,000 in the United States and Europe. The mean age of death is ~12 years, although the different forms differ significantly. Individuals with the type I (or classical) form of the disorder usually first show symptoms between one and three years and have lifespans of between 20 and 40 years. Type II Cockayne syndrome (CSB) is more severe: symptoms present at birth and individuals live to approximately 6–7 years of age. Type III has the mildest symptoms, first presents later in childhood, and the cause of death is often severe nervous system deterioration and respiratory tract infections.

Individuals with CS appear prematurely aged and exhibit severe slower growth leading to short stature. They have a small head (less than the -3 standard deviation), fail to gain weight and failure to thrive. They also have extreme cutaneous photosensitivity (sensitivity to sunlight), neurodevelopmental abnormalities, and deafness, and often exhibit lipoatrophy, atrophic skin, severe tooth decay, sparse hair, calcium deposits in neurons, cataracts, sensorineural hearing loss, pigmentary retinopathy, and bone abnormalities. However, they do not have a higher risk of cancer.

Type I and II are known to be caused by mutation of a specific gene. CSA is caused by mutations in the cross-complementing gene 8 (ERCC8), which encodes for the CSA protein. These mutations are thought to cause alternate splicing of the pre-mRNA which leads to an abnormal protein. CSB is caused by mutations in the ERCC6 gene, which encodes the CSB protein. CSA and CSB are involved in transcription-coupled NER (TC-NER), which is involved in repairing DNA; they ubiquitinate RNA polymerase II, halting its progress thus allowing the TC-NER mechanism to be carried out. The ubiquitinated RNAP II then dissociates and is degraded via the proteasome. Mutations in ERCC8, ERCC6, or both mean DNA is no longer repaired through TC-NER, and the accumulation of mutations leads to cell death, which may contribute to the symptoms of Cockayne syndrome.

==== Xeroderma pigmentosum ====
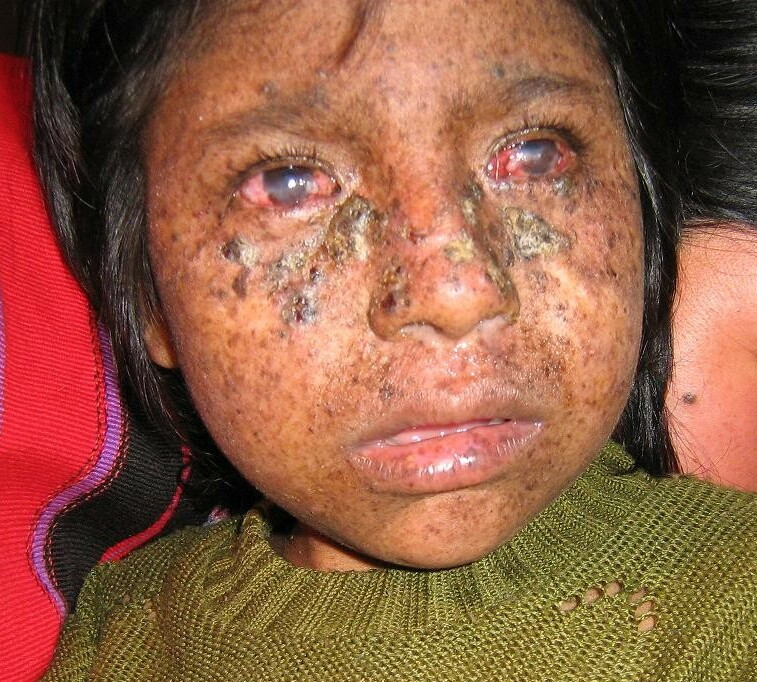
An eight-year-old girl from Guatemala with xeroderma pigmentosum. Children with XP are often colloquially referred to as Children of the Night.

Xeroderma pigmentosum (XP) is a rare autosomal recessive disorder, affecting about one per million in the United States and autochthonic Europe populations but with a higher incidence rate in Japan, North Africa, and the Middle East. There have been 830 published cases from 1874 to 1982. The disorder presents at infancy or early childhood.

Xeroderma pigmentosum mostly affects the eye and skin. Individuals with XP have extreme sensitivity to light in the ultraviolet range starting from one to two years of age, and causes sunburn, freckling of skin, dry skin and pigmentation after exposure. When the eye is exposed to sunlight, it becomes irritated and bloodshot, and the cornea becomes cloudy. Around 30% of affected individuals also develop neurological abnormalities, including deafness, poor coordination, decreased intellectual abilities, difficulty swallowing and talking, and seizures; these effects tend to become progressively worse over time. All affected individuals have a 1000-fold higher risk of developing skin cancer: half of the affected population develop skin cancer by age 10, usually at areas most exposed to sunlight (e.g. face, head, or neck). The risk for other cancers such as brain tumors, lung cancer and eye cancers also increase.

There are eight types of XP (XP-A through XP-G), plus a variant type (XP-V), all categorized based on the genetic cause. XP can be caused by mutations in any of these genes: DDB2, ERCC2, ERCC3, ERCC4, ERCC5, XPA, XPC. These genes are all involved in the NER repair pathway that repairs damaged DNA. The variant form, XP-V, is caused by mutations in the POLH gene, which unlike the rest does not code for components of the NER pathway but produces a DNA polymerase that allows accurate translesion synthesis of DNA damage resulting from UV radiation; its mutation leads to an overall increase in UV-dependent mutation, which ultimately causes the symptoms of XP.

==== Trichothiodystrophy ====
Trichothiodystrophy (TTD) is a rare autosomal recessive disease whose symptoms span across multiple systems and can vary greatly in severity. The incidence rate of TTD is estimated to be 1.2 per million in Western Europe. Milder cases cause sparse and brittle hair, which is due to the lack of sulfur, an element that is part of the matrix proteins that give hair its strength. More severe cases cause delayed development, significant intellectual disability, and recurrent infection; the most severe cases see death at infancy or early childhood.

TTD also affects the mother of the affected child during pregnancy, when she may experience pregnancy-induced high blood pressure and develop HELLP syndrome. The baby has a high risk of being born prematurely and will have a low birth weight. After birth, the child's normal growth is slower than normal, resulting in a short stature.

Other symptoms include scaly skin, abnormalities of the fingernails and toenails, clouding of the lens of the eye from birth (congenital cataracts), poor co-ordination, and ocular and skeletal abnormalities. Half of affected individuals also experience photosensitivity to UV light.

TTD is caused by mutations in one of three genes, ERCC2, ERCC3, or GTF2H5, the first two of which are also linked to xeroderma pigmentosum. However, patients with TTD do not show a higher risk of developing skin cancer, in contrast to patients with XP. The three genes associated with TTD encode for XPB, XPD and p8/TTDA of the general transcription factor IIH (TFIIH) complex, which is involved in transcription and DNA damage repair. Mutations in one of these genes cause reduction of gene transcription, which may be involved in development (including placental development), and thus may explain hindrance in intellectual abilities, in some cases; these mutations also lead to reduction in DNA repair, causing photosensitivity.

A form of TTD without photosensitivity also exists, although its mechanism is unclear. The MPLKIP gene has been associated with this form of TTD, although it accounts for only 20% of all known cases of the non-photosensitive form of TTD, and the function of its gene product is also unclear. Mutations in the TTDN1 gene explain another 10% of non-photosensitive TTD. The function of the gene product of TTDN1 is unknown, but the sex organs of individuals with this form of TTD often produce no hormones, a condition known as hypogonadism.

== Defects in Lamin A/C ==
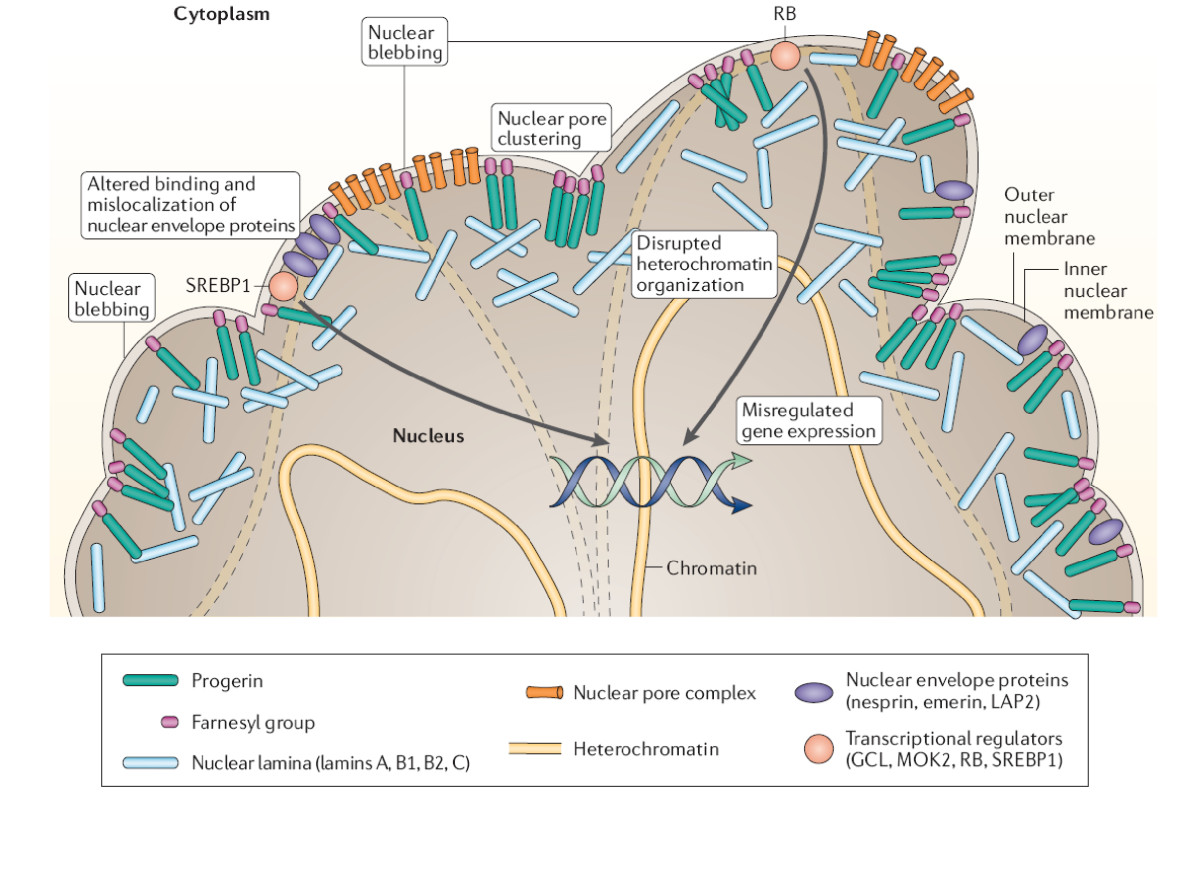
Lamin is required at the inner nuclear membrane to ensure the nucleus keeps its shape. Mutations in LMNA causes dysfunctional lamin, and the nucleus can no longer keeps its shape. This leads to mislocalisation of heterochromatin, which normally lie in close proximity, or with, the nuclear matrix, nuclear blebbing and misregulation of gene expression.

Hutchinson–Gilford progeria syndrome (HGPS) and restrictive dermopathy (RD) are two PS caused by a defect in lamin A/C, which is encoded by the LMNA gene. Lamin A is a major nuclear component that determines the shape and integrity of the nucleus, by acting as a scaffold protein that forms a filamentous meshwork underlying the inner nuclear envelope, the membrane that surrounds the nucleus.

=== Hutchinson–Gilford progeria syndrome ===
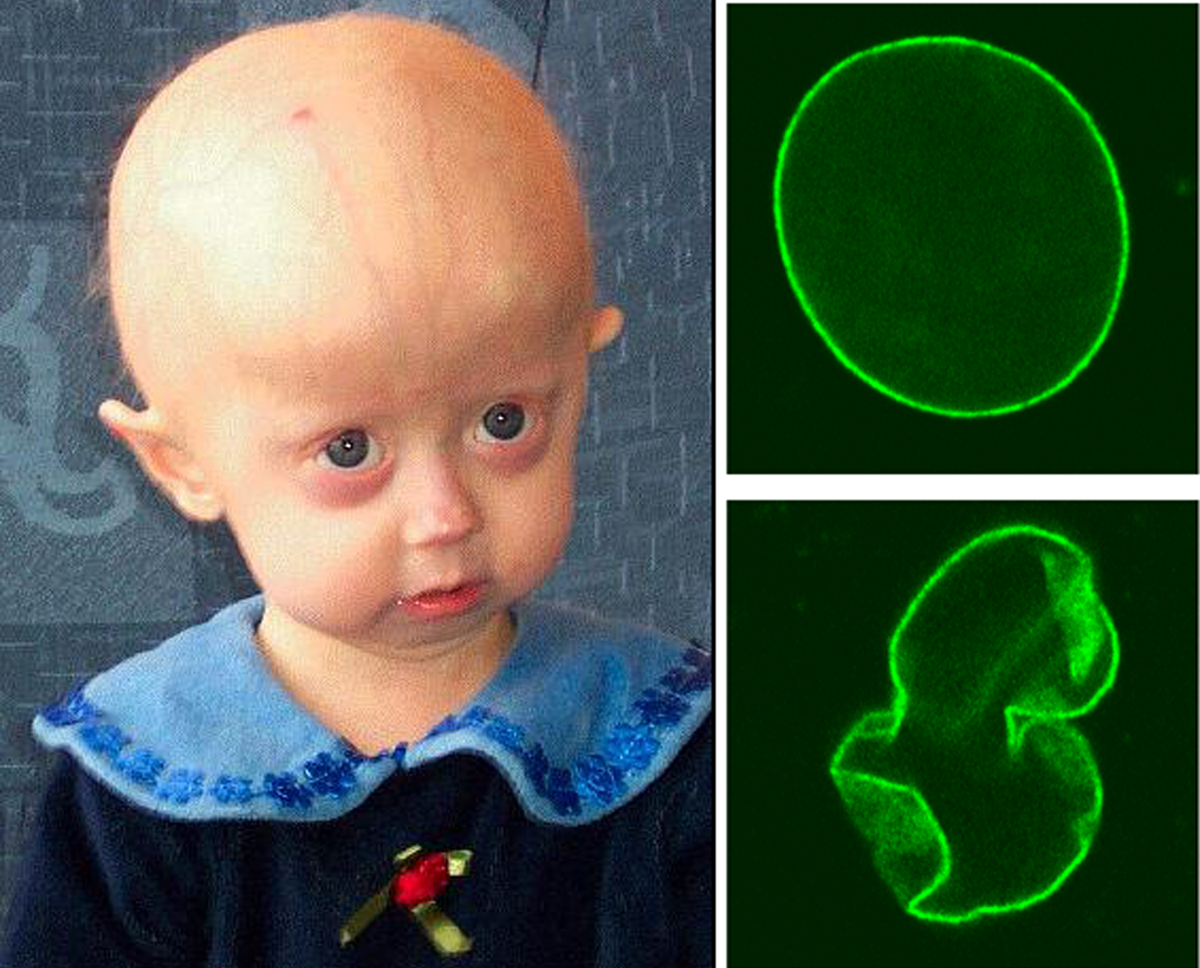
Girl with HGPS (left). This condition is caused by dysfunctional lamin which is unable to maintain the nuclear shape (normal at top, abnormal at bottom).

Hutchinson–Gilford progeria syndrome is an extremely rare developmental autosomal dominant condition, characterized by premature and accelerated aging (~7 times the normal rate) beginning at childhood. It affects 1 in ~4 million newborns; over 130 cases have been reported in the literature since the first described case in 1886. The mean age of diagnosis is ~3 years and the mean age of death is ~13 years. The cause of death is usually myocardial infarction, caused by the severe hardening of the arteries (arteriosclerosis). There is currently no treatment available.

Individuals with HGPS typically appear normal at birth, but their growth is severely hindered, resulting in short stature, a very low body weight and delayed tooth eruption. Their facial/cranial proportions and facial features are abnormal, characterized by larger-than-normal eyes, a thin, beaked nose, thin lips, small chin and jaw (micrognathia), protruding ears, scalp hair, eyebrows, and lashes, hair loss, large head, large fontanelle and generally appearing aged. Other features include skeletal alterations (osteolysis, osteoporosis), amyotrophy (wasting of muscle), lipodystrophy and skin atrophy (loss of subcutaneous tissue and fat) with sclerodermatous focal lesions, severe atherosclerosis and prominent scalp veins. However, the level of cognitive function, motor skills, and risk of developing cancer is not affected significantly.

HGPS is caused by sporadic mutations (not inherited from parent) in the LMNA gene, which encodes for lamin A. Specifically, most HGPS are caused by a dominant, de novo, point mutation p.G608G (GGC > GGT). This mutation causes a splice site within exon 11 of the pre-mRNA to come into action, leading to the last 150 base pairs of that exon, and consequently, the 50 amino acids near the C-terminus, being deleted. This results in a truncated lamin A precursor (a.k.a. progerin or LaminAΔ50).

After being translated, a farnesol is added to prelamin A using protein farnesyltransferase; this farnesylation is important in targeting lamin to the nuclear envelope, where it maintains its integrity. Normally, lamin A is recognized by ZMPSTE24 (FACE1, a metalloprotease) and cleaved, removing the farnesol and a few other amino acids.

In the truncated lamin A precursor, this cleavage is not possible and the prelamin A cannot mature. When the truncated prelamin A is localized to the nuclear envelope, it will not be processed and accumulates, leading to "lobulation of the nuclear envelope, thickening of the nuclear lamina, loss of peripheral heterochromatin, and clustering of nuclear pores", causing the nucleus to lose its shape and integrity. The prelamin A also maintains the farnesyl and a methyl moiety on its C-terminal cysteine residue, ensuring their continued localization at the membrane. When this farnesylation is prevented using farnesyltransferase inhibitor (FTI), the abnormalities in nuclear shape are significantly reduced.

HGPS is considered autosomal dominant, which means that only one of the two copies of the LMNA gene needs to be mutated to produce this phenotype. As the phenotype is caused by an accumulation of the truncated prelamin A, only mutation in one of the two genes is sufficient. At least 16 Other mutations in lamin A/C, or defects in the ZMPSTE24 gene, have been shown to cause HGPS and other progeria-like symptoms, although these are less studied.

Repair of DNA double-strand breaks can occur by one of two processes, non-homologous end joining (NHEJ) or homologous recombination (HR). A-type lamins promote genetic stability by maintaining levels of proteins which have key roles in NHEJ and HR. Mouse cells deficient for maturation of prelamin A show increased DNA damage and chromosome aberrations and have increased sensitivity to DNA damaging agents. In HGPS, the inability to adequately repair DNA damages due to defective A-type lamin may cause aspects of premature aging (see DNA damage theory of aging).

=== Restrictive dermopathy ===
Restrictive dermopathy (RD), also called tight skin contracture syndrome, is a rare, lethal autosomal recessive perinatal genodermatosis. Two known causes of RD are mutations in the LMNA gene, which lead to the production of truncated prelamin A precursor, and insertions in the ZMPSTE24, which lead to a premature stop codon.

Individuals with RD exhibit slower growth starting in the uterus, tight and rigid skin with erosions, prominent superficial vasculature and epidermal hyperkeratosis, abnormal facial features (small mouth, small pinched nose and micrognathia), sparse or absent eyelashes and eyebrows, mineralization defects of the skull, thin dysplastic clavicles, pulmonary hypoplasia and multiple joint contractures. Most affected individuals die in the uterus or are stillbirths, and liveborns usually die within a week.

== Defects in FBN1 ==
Patients with Marfan-progeroid-lipodystrophy syndrome typically exhibit congenital lipodystrophy and a neonatal progeroid appearance. Sometimes identified as having neonatal progeroid syndrome, the term is a misnomer since they do not exhibit accelerated aging. The condition is caused by mutations near the 3'-terminus of the FBN1 gene.

== A common cause for premature aging ==
Hutchinson–Gilford progeria syndrome, Werner syndrome, and Cockayne syndrome are the three genetic disorders in which patients have premature aging features. Premature aging also develops on some animal models which have genetic alterations. Although the patients with these syndromes and the animal models with premature aging symptoms have different genetic backgrounds, they all have abnormal structures of tissues/organs as a result of defective development. Misrepair-accumulation aging theory suggests that the abnormality of tissue structure is the common point between premature aging and normal aging. Premature aging is a result of Mis-construction during development as a consequence of gene mutations, whereas normal aging is a result of accumulation of Misrepairs for the survival of an organism. Thus the process of development and that of aging are coupled by Mis-construction and Mis-re-construction (Misrepair) of the structure of an organism.

== Unknown causes ==
=== Wiedemann–Rautenstrauch syndrome ===
Wiedemann–Rautenstrauch (WR) syndrome, also known as neonatal progeroid syndrome, is an autosomal recessive progeroid syndrome. More than 30 cases have been reported. Most affected individuals die by seven months of age, but some do survive into their teens.

WR is associated with abnormalities in bone maturation, and lipids and hormone metabolism. Affected individuals exhibit intrauterine and postnatal slower growth, leading to short stature and an aged appearance from birth. They have physical abnormalities including a large head (macrocephaly), sparse hair, prominent scalp veins, inward-folded eyelids, widened anterior fontanelles, hollow cheeks (malar hypoplasia), general loss of fat tissues under the skin, delayed tooth eruption, abnormal hair pattern, beaked noses, mild to severe intellectual disability and dysmorphism.

The cause of WR is unknown, although defects in DNA repair have been implicated.

==== Rothmund–Thomson syndrome ====
Classified as an autosomal recessive defect, but the pathology has still yet to be well researched.

== Cancer ==
Some segmental progeroid syndromes, such as Werner syndrome (WS), Bloom syndrome (BS), Rothmund-Thomson syndromes (RTS) and combined xeroderma pigmentosa-Cockayne syndrome (XP-CS), are associated with an increased risk of developing cancer in the affected individual; two exceptions are Hutchinson–Gilford progeria (HGPS) and Cockayne syndrome.

== Animal models ==
Within animal models for progeroid syndromes, early observations have detected abnormalities within overall mitochondrial function, signal transduction between membrane receptors, and nuclear regulatory proteins.

== Society and popular culture ==
=== People ===
Hayley Okines was an English girl with classic progeria famed for her efforts in spreading awareness of the condition. She was featured in the media.

Lizzie Velásquez is an American motivational speaker who has a syndrome that resembles progeria, although the exact nature is unclear; it is now thought to be a form of neonatal progeroid syndrome. Velásquez is an advocate of anti-bullying.

Jesper Sørensen is widely recognized in Denmark as the only child in Denmark and Scandinavia with progeria (as of 2008). His fame came about after a documentary in 2008 on TV 2 about Sørensen.

Adalia Rose Williams was a popular social media influencer who was born in Austin, Texas, suffered from Hutchinson–Gilford progeroid syndrome (HGPS) and died on January 12, 2022 at the age of 15 due to her medical condition. She amassed an estimate of subscribers and followers ranging from 3–15+ million on YouTube, Instagram, and Facebook. (Note: While the BBC article said she amassed almost 3 million subscribers on YouTube, the NBC news article claimed she amassed more than 15 millions subscribers/followers on YouTube, Facebook, and Instagram.)

=== Literature and Theatre ===
F. Scott Fitzgerald's 1922 short story The Curious Case of Benjamin Button is about a boy who was born with the appearance of a 70-year-old and who ages backwards. This short story is thought to be inspired by progeria. The description of the fictitious Smallweed family in the Charles Dickens' Bleak House suggests the characters had progeria. Christopher Snow, the main character in Dean Koontz's Moonlight Bay Trilogy, has xeroderma pigmentosum, as does Luke from the 2002 novel Going Out by Scarlett Thomas. In the visual novel Chaos;Head, the character Shogun eventually dies of a progeroid syndrome, and in its sequel Chaos;Child, more characters get this same fictional progeroid syndrome, which by then is called Chaos Child Syndrome. In Kimberly Akimbo, a 2000 play by David Lindsay-Abaire, and its Tony Award for Best Musical-winning adaptation of the same name, the main character, Kimberly Levaco, has an unnamed progeria-like condition.

=== Film ===
Paa, a 2009 Indian comedy-drama film, features a protagonist, Auro (Amitabh Bachchan), who has progeria. Jack is a 1996 American comedy-drama film, in which the titular character (portrayed by Robin Williams) has Werner syndrome.

== See also ==
- DeSanctis–Cacchione syndrome, an extremely rare variant of xeroderma pigmentosum (XP)
- Dyskeratosis congenita, a rare progressive congenital disorder of the skin and bone marrow in some ways resembling progeria
- Fanconi anemia, a rare genetic defect in a cluster of proteins responsible for DNA repair
- Li–Fraumeni syndrome, a rare autosomal genetic disorder caused by defects in DNA repair
- Nijmegen breakage syndrome, a rare autosomal recessive genetic disorder caused by defect(s) in the Double Holliday junction DNA repair mechanism
- Nestor-Guillermo progeria syndrome, an extremely rare genetic disorder which is unique from other PS because of the absence of any cardiovascular abnormalities (which lead to premature death in cases where they are present)
