= Sammy Basso =

Italian biologist and writer with progeria (1995–2024)

- Born: 1 December 1995; Schio, Italy
- Died: 5 October 2024 (aged 28); Asolo, Italy
- Occupation: Biologist
- Years active: 2010–2024
- Known for: Being one of the oldest known survivors of progeria and an advocate for research on the disease
- Notable work: Il viaggio di Sammy

Sammy Basso (1 December 1995 – 5 October 2024) was an Italian biologist with progeria, and one of the oldest known survivors of the disease. Basso also took part in clinical trials for which he carried out research.

== Early life and education ==
Basso was born in 1995 in Schio, Italy, and grew up in Tezze sul Brenta, a small town near Venice. At the age of 2, he was diagnosed with progeria, also known as Hutchinson-Gilford syndrome, a rare genetic disorder that accelerates aging. In the world a mere 130 cases of progeria have been recognized. From the age of 5, he was a friend of Sam Berns, a person with the same condition. Despite the challenges, his family encouraged him to attend school and participate in everyday activities. He earned a master's degree in molecular biology, contributing to significant research efforts aimed at understanding and treating the disease.

== Youth ==
Through research on the Internet, Basso's family found an American association, the Sunshine Foundation, and in 2000 began to participate in the world meetings that it organises every year for families with children with progeria. In addition, the family also started to attend European meetings organised by the Dutch association Progeria Family Circle in 2002. At the meetings organised by the American associations, exchanges between the families of children affected by this disease are encouraged, while at the meetings of the European associations, it is possible for families and doctors dealing with progeria to meet: the various associations play a central role in promoting the exchange of knowledge between doctors and doctors, communication between doctors and parents, and the sharing of experiences between parents. Basso graduated at the Liceo Scientifico Jacopo Da Ponte in Bassano del Grappa.

Soon after his graduation, Basso took a trip to the United States with his parents, Laura and Amerigo, and his friend Riccardo, travelling along U.S. Route 66 from Chicago to Los Angeles. Basso documented this trip by writing the book Il viaggio di Sammy (Sammy's Journey), and recording some episodes that were broadcast by the Nat Geo People channel. In the 2014–2015 academic year, he enrolled in the Physics degree programme at the University of Padua; his dream, once he had completed his studies, was to work at CERN in Geneva.

On 13 February 2015, Basso was invited as a guest to the 65th edition of the Sanremo Music Festival, speaking about his illness. In 2016, he enrolled in a degree programme in Natural Sciences at the University of Padua with the intention of further researching progeria once he had completed his studies. He graduated with a Bachelor of Science degree in natural sciences with 110 cum laude on 17 July 2018, and he obtained a Master of Science degree in Molecular Biology in English on 24 March 2021. On 7 June 2019, he received the insignia of the Knighthood of the Order of Merit of the Italian Republic, of which he had been awarded motu proprio by the Italian president Sergio Mattarella.

== Contributions to scientific research ==
During their first trip to the United States, Basso's parents had the opportunity to meet the parents of Sam Berns, another boy suffering from progeria and whose parents led to the establishment of the Progeria Research Foundation. On that occasion, the Basso family contributed to the activation of a bank of cell lines that can be used by those wishing to carry out research on progeria. This availability together with the progress of studies on the disease in 2003 led to the discovery of the gene affected by the mutations responsible for progeria. This pathology is due to the mutation of the LMNA gene responsible for the production of two proteins: lamins A and C; the mutation causes the production of truncated lamins A, called progerins, which cause the premature ageing typical of the disease.

In 2006, the Basso family joined a progeria clinical study programme at the National Institutes of Health in Bethesda, Maryland, where the Human Genome Research Institute (NHGRI) is based. At that centre, the complete collection of data on Basso's organs and apparatuses was carried out for the first time for research purposes. As a result of this programme, an experimental drug, Lonafarnib, a transferase inhibitor, was developed that might be able to slow down the course of the disease. This allowed the first clinical study of 28 children (including Basso) with progeria to be carried out in Boston in 2007. This was followed by a second, also in Boston, and a third in Marseille.

== Death and legacy ==
On the day before his death, Basso was actively communicating. He collapsed and died due to suspected cardiovascular complications on 5 October 2024 at the age of 28. Francis Collins, Basso's senior research colleague and companion, said: "We all knew that Sammy had a terrible circumstance that was not going to allow him to live a full life. But he was so vibrant. He was so alive. He was so engaged, I was so stunned." On a personal level, Basso called progeria "a small part of my life, because it only affects the body". An obituary of Sammy was published by and featured on the last substantive page of The Economist. At Basso's funeral, Giuliano Brugnotto, the Catholic bishop of Vicenza, opened the possibility of beatification owing to Basso's "deep and extraordinary" faith.

His spiritual testament was publicly read for a second time in Santa Maria della Salute, Venice, on 21 November 2024.

== Personal life ==
Basso was a Roman Catholic from his early life. A friend of Carlo Conti, who hosted Basso at the 2015 Sanremo Festival, and of the Italian singer Jovanotti, in November 2013 he received a phone call directly from Pope Francis.
