= Life According to Sam =

- Directed by: Sean Fine; Andrea Nix Fine
- Produced by: Sean Fine; Andrea Nix Fine; Miriam Weintraub
- Starring: Sam Berns
- Music by: Keegan DeWitt
- Production companies: HBO Documentary Films; Fine Films
- Distributed by: HBO
- Release date: October 21, 2013
- Running time: 94 minutes
- Country: United States

Life According to Sam is an HBO original documentary film directed by Sean Fine and Andrea Nix Fine. Premiering in January 2013 at the Sundance Film Festival, the documentary discloses the impact that progeria had on the lives of Sam Berns and his parents, Dr. Leslie Gordon and Dr. Scott Berns. It was broadcast on HBO in October 2013, and since then it has won a 2013 Peabody Award and an Emmy Award for Exceptional Merit in Documentary Filmmaking. It was also one of the 15 titles considered for nomination in the Documentary Feature category for the 86th Oscars.

Told from the personal point of view of Sam, his parents, and other families suffering from the effects of progeria, the documentary raises awareness on this currently incurable disease. It informs and educates the audience on what progeria is, what it means for patients, and calls attention to the need for research on treatment.

== Synopsis ==
The documentary concerns the young teen, Sampson Gordon Berns, one of the few hundreds of patients around the world diagnosed with progeria. As stated in the film, progeria is an extremely rare and fatal genetic disease also referred to as premature aging syndrome. When Sam was diagnosed, nothing was known about the disease genetically, and there was no treatment nor cure. The prognosis was that he was likely to die around the age of 13, as was the average for progeria patients. Sam's mom, Dr. Leslie Gordon, was in her first year of medical residency when he was diagnosed at around the age of two and had to change her course of plan accordingly.

The film features both of his parents discussing how their lives changed after the diagnosis. After six months of the diagnosis, Dr. Leslie Gordon, Dr. Scott Berns, and Sam's aunt, Audrey Gordon, founded the Progeria Research Foundation. They were able to raise $1.25 million for research, which led to the discovery of the gene responsible for the disease. The film includes the journey that Dr. Leslie Gordon underwent in trying to find a successful treatment for the disease. Experimenting with a drug being used for similar protein abnormalities, Lonafarnib, Leslie meets other children with progeria to conduct clinical trials that would last two years and a half. The children and their parents are interviewed, and they discuss their experiences with progeria and their thoughts on Leslie's trial.

Since the number of progeria patients is so limited and treatment was a matter of ethics, Leslie made a critical decision that would lead to issues concerning earning a publication of the study from a peer-reviewed journal. Meanwhile, Sam manages to participate in sports and hobbies that would prove difficult for progeria patients, and Scott makes time for therapeutic activities for Sam.

== Cast ==
- Sampson "Sam" Gordon Berns
- Leslie B. Gordon, M.D., Ph.D.
- Dr. Scott D. Berns
- Audrey Gordon
- Sumaira
- Priya
- Niccolo
- Megan
- Devin
- Zoey
- Dr. Kleinman

== Production ==
When the married directors, Sean Fine and Andrea Nix Fine, first met Sam, Sam told them, "I think we are all going to be very good friends here. There are other films that have been out there on progeria, and I don't want this film to be like those films. I don't ever want people to feel sorry for me. That is the one thing I am going to ask you guys." When the directors started filming, Dr. Leslie Gordon had already begun her first set of clinical trials using Lonafarnib on 26 progeria patients. According to Los Angeles Times, Sean Fine claimed that they thought the trials would be finished in a year, but "(they) didn't realize how hard it is to get a scientific paper published. That made the film take three years." The filmmakers also claim getting close to Sam during that time and admiring him for the fun kid that he was. It was also stated that Sam watched the finished film by himself before anyone else, including his parents, did. In an e-mail interview, Sam announced, "I wanted to be able to process what was on screen and to be able to watch it and react without having to worry about other people's reactions at the same time watching it."

== Reception ==
On the review aggregator website Rotten Tomatoes, 100% of 8 critics' reviews are positive, with an average rating of 7/10. Dorothy Rabinowitz, of The Wall Street Journal, comments, "... nothing in this documentary equals the portrait of the unforgettable son they produced." Duane Byrge from The Hollywood Reporter, who attended the premiere at the Sundance Film Festival, reported that the audience stayed after the film for the Q&A- "a sure sign that they loved the movie." Moved by the inspirational approach that Sam and his family took upon his diagnosis, the bottom line quote for The Hollywood Reporter was posted as, "Wise and uplifting film about one young boy's graceful resilience against a rare terminal disease." Hank Stuever from The Washington Post claims: "The film is as much – or maybe more – about Sam's resiliently proactive mother, Leslie Gordon, as it is about Sam."

== Impact ==
Robert Kraft, the owner of the New England Patriots, saw the film at the premiere in New York City and met Sam at a team practice. He felt inspired and impassioned, and he donated a $500,000 matching gift to support and fund the expansion of the Progeria clinical trials. It was reported that he commented, "This is a must-see film. It will make you laugh. It will make you cry. And, most importantly, I think it will motivate people to want to do more to help."

== Awards ==
- 2013 Peabody Award
- Emmy Award for Exceptional Merit in Documentary Filmmaking
- Christopher Award
- "Best of Fest" at the American Film Institute Docs Film Festival in Washington, DC
- Audience Award: Nantucket, Martha's Vineyard Film Festivals, Woods Hole, Boston Jewish Film Festival, and Newbury Port
- Norman Vaughan Indomitable Spirit Award: Mountain Film Festival, Colorado
- Best Storytelling Award: Nantucket, and MA Film Festivals
- Best Feature Documentary: Woods Hole, Rhode Island International Film Festivals, New Hampshire, MA Film Festivals
