= Sam Berns =

American activist (1996–2014)

- Sam Berns at an October 2013 Washington, D.C., venue via TEDx MidAtlantic
- Born: Sampson Gordon Berns; October 23, 1996; Providence, Rhode Island, U.S.
- Died: January 10, 2014 (aged 17); Foxborough, Massachusetts, U.S.
- Cause of death: Complications from progeria
- Education: Foxborough High School
- Occupation: Activist
- Known for: HBO documentary on progeria, spreading progeria awareness
- Parents: Scott Berns; Leslie Gordon

Sampson Gordon Berns (October 23, 1996 – January 10, 2014) was an American activist with progeria, an extremely rare and fatal disease that causes the body to age rapidly. Berns helped raise awareness about the disease, and he was the subject of the HBO documentary Life According to Sam, which was first screened in January 2013.

== Progeria Research Foundation ==
His parents, Scott Berns and Leslie Gordon, both pediatricians, received their son's diagnosis when he was less than two years old. Roughly a year later, in an effort to increase awareness of the condition, they established the Progeria Research Foundation to promote research into the underlying causes of and possible treatments for the disease. Moreover, they offer resources for the support of those with progeria and their families.

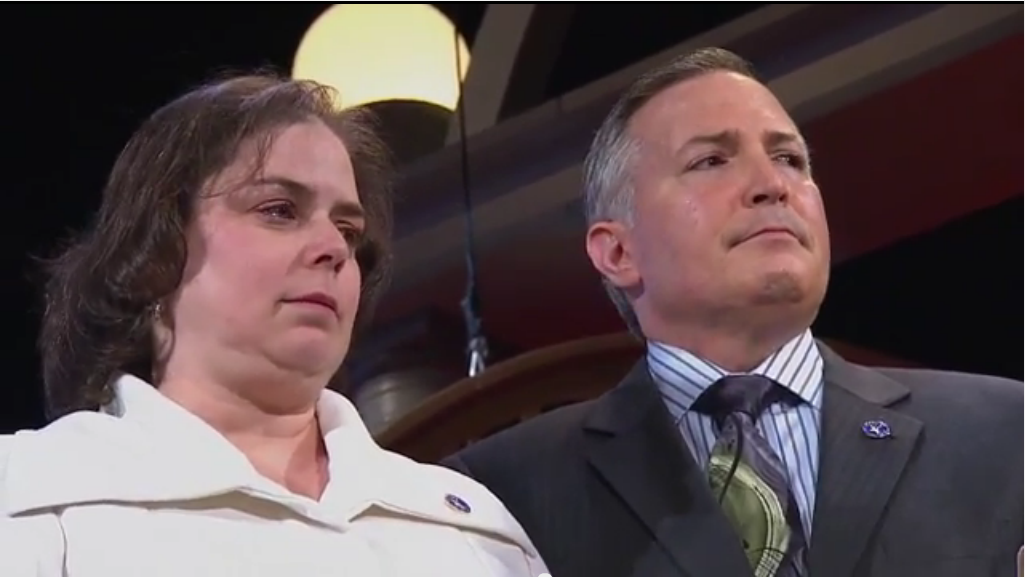
Scott Berns and Leslie Gordon, the parents of Sam, at the Peabody Award ceremony

== Honors ==
=== Boston Bruins ===
On November 9, 2013, at a home game for the Boston Bruins, Berns helped host Progeria Awareness Night, sat with the team as an assistant equipment manager, and dropped the ceremonial first puck for that night's game against the Toronto Maple Leafs. Berns and Zdeno Chára, the Bruins captain, had been strong friends since 2006, when Berns attended a Bruins game and met Chára afterwards. Chára had scored in that game and Berns blurted out "You're the hero!" Chára responded: "No, no, you're my hero, our hero." On January 14, 2014, the Bruins honored Berns with a moment of silence and a video tribute before the start of the game.

=== New England Patriots ===
Berns was to be an honorary captain when the New England Patriots hosted the Indianapolis Colts in a divisional playoff game on January 11, 2014; however, he died on January 10, the evening before the game. Patriots Chairman and CEO Robert Kraft issued a statement on the news of the passing of Berns. Kraft said: "I loved Sam Berns and am richer for having known him."

=== TED Talk, Sam Berns ===
"My Philosophy for a Happy Life" was recorded in 2013 by Berns at the TEDxMidAtlantic, and has been viewed over 54 million times on YouTube and has the most comments of any TEDTalk at over 51,000 (as of August 2025) and 1.1 million likes.

=== Life According to Sam ===
Life According to Sam is a 2013 documentary film based on the life of Berns and has been shown at film festivals, including Sundance, and it was broadcast on HBO in October. The Academy of Motion Picture Arts and Sciences said it is among 15 documentaries considered for Oscar nominations.

== See also ==
- Hayley Okines — English girl who had progeria and was the subject of television specials both in Europe and in the United States
- Lizzie Velásquez — American motivational speaker with a similar but non-terminal medical condition (Marfanoid–progeroid–lipodystrophy syndrome)
- Sammy Basso — Italian biologist who had progeria and is one of the oldest known survivors of the disease
