= Hayley Okines =

British activist with progeria (1997–2015)

- Born: Hayley Leanne Okines; 3 December 1997; Arrington, Cambridgeshire, England
- Died: 2 April 2015 (aged 17); Bexhill-on-Sea, East Sussex, England
- Cause of death: Complications from progeria
- Occupation: Author
- Known for: Progeria activism

Hayley Leanne Okines (3 December 1997 – 2 April 2015) was an English author and activist who was a sufferer of the extremely rare aging disease progeria. She was known for spreading awareness of the condition. Although the life expectancy for those with the condition is 13 years, Okines was part of a drug trial that had seen her surpass doctors' predictions of her projected lifespan. She died on 2 April 2015 at the age of 17, having lived four years beyond doctors' initial predictions.

Okines was diagnosed with progeria at the age of two, and doctors put her projected lifespan at thirteen years. She frequently travelled to Boston in the United States to receive new treatments. In 2012, her autobiography, titled Old Before My Time, was published; it was co-authored by Okines, her mother Kerry, and contributor Alison Stokes.

== Television appearances ==
Okines was the subject of television specials in both Europe and North America. Discovery Health aired a special titled Extreme Aging: Hayley's Story, which focused on the balance of the disease being currently terminal but with a possible cure on the horizon. In the UK, a television documentary titled Extraordinary Lives also discussed Okines, her condition, and her options.

When she was 13 years old, she was featured on a French television show on 20 January 2012 called Tous Différents ("All Different", NT1).

When she was ten years old, Okines was featured in "Hope for Hayley", an episode of the British series Extraordinary People. The episode concerned Okines' trips to Boston for treatment.

She was featured in the second part of a three-part documentary series called Make Me Live Forever, in which presenter Michael Mosley investigated a number of proposed treatments to enable humans to extend their lifespan. Okines was discussed in relation to telomeres (short telomeres are a characteristic of progeria) and their apparent role in the aging process.

She was also featured in a report by Tara Brown on the Australian version of 60 Minutes.

== Books ==
Okines' first book, Old Before My Time, chronicled her early life and struggle with progeria. Her follow-up book, Young at Heart, followed her years as a teenager with progeria, notably with her teenage interests and her struggle with paralysis.

== Fundraisers ==
Although the United States' Progeria Research funded Okines's treatment, her family had to fund the air fare. Some athletes were inspired by Okines to raise money for progeria research. London's Chelsea Football Club raised thousands of pounds through a charity raffle in Okines's honour. Additionally, after Steve Keen saw Okines on a television special, he bicycled 1,000 miles (1,600 km) to support her.

In December 2010, Okines met Justin Bieber after a group of people started an awareness campaign on Twitter.

== "Voices of Tomorrow" ==
When Jane Winiberg saw a progeria television special, she and Mark Street wrote a song about Okines and other children. The Kids Choir 2000, which included Okines, performed the vocals on the song, titled "Voices of Tomorrow". "Life Will Find a Way" is another similar track on the album, and the profits are being donated to the Progeria Research Foundation.

== See also ==
- Sam Berns — American male with progeria who was the only child of the doctors who established the Progeria Research Foundation.
- Lizzie Velásquez — American motivational speaker with a similar but non-terminal medical condition (Marfanoid–progeroid–lipodystrophy syndrome).
