= Leon Botha =

South African artist (1985–2011)

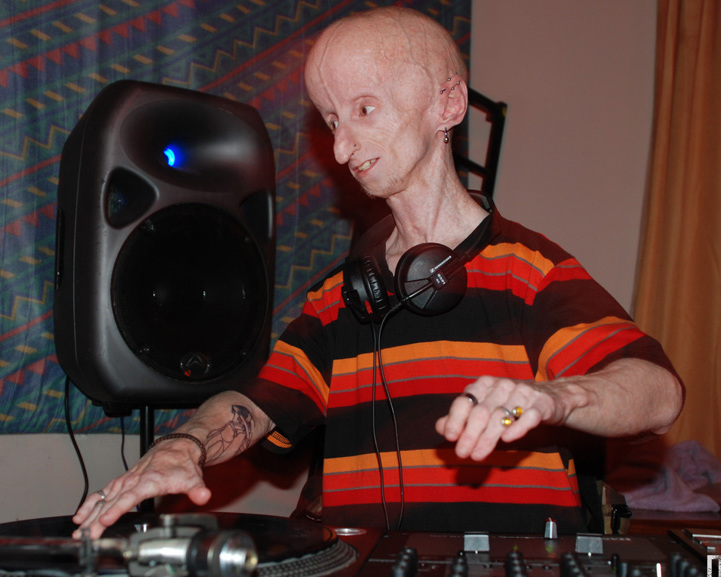
- Leon Botha on 30 October 2009
- Born: 4 June 1985; Cape Town, South Africa
- Died: 5 June 2011 (aged 26); Cape Town, South Africa
- Occupations: Painter; entertainer
- Years active: 2007–2011

Leon Botha (4 June 1985 – 5 June 2011) was a South African painter and disk jockey. He was known for his close association with the hip hop group Die Antwoord, as well as for being the second of the world's longest-lived persons with progeria before Sammy Basso who was one of the oldest known survivors of the disease.

== Biography ==
Botha was born in Cape Town, South Africa, and lived there until his death. He was diagnosed with progeria around the age of 4 years. He had no formal training in art beyond high school courses at the Tygerberg Art Centre, but became a full-time painter after graduation, doing commissioned works.

In 2005, Botha successfully underwent heart bypass surgery to prevent a heart attack due to progeria-related atherosclerosis.

In January 2007, Botha had his first solo art exhibition, entitled "Liquid Sword; I am HipHop", revolving around hip-hop culture as a way of life. It took place at the Rust-en-Vrede (which translates to Rest and Peace) gallery in Durbanville and was opened by Mr Fat of the South African hip hop group Brasse Vannie Kaap. His second solo exhibition opened in March 2009 and featured pieces of the artist's life. Botha was asked if the title "Liquid Swords; Slices of Le~~m~~on" referred to the adage "If life gives you lemons, make lemonade." Botha said no, adding, "Lemons? I slice 'em and serve 'em back!"

In January 2010, he hosted the first exhibit of Who Am I? Transgressions, a photo collaboration with Gordon Clark, at the João Ferreira Gallery in Cape Town. Botha said of the exhibition, "I am a spiritual being, the same as you, primarily. Then I'm a human being and this part of the human being is the body, which has a condition."

Botha was also engaged in deejaying and turntablism under the name DJ Solarize. He was featured alongside Watkin Tudor Jones, aka Ninja, in the music video "Enter the Ninja" from Die Antwoord.

In November 2010, Botha suffered a stroke. Botha died from complications of progeria in Cape Town one day after his 26th birthday.

Botha was the inspiration for the one-act opera Solarize, by Marcin Stańczyk, libretto by Andrzej Szpindler, which debuted in Warsaw in April 2014 at Teatr Wielki, the Polish National Opera.
