= PRF =

PRF may refer to:

== Science and technology ==
- Physical register file, in CPU design
- Platelet rich fibrin
- Pontine reticular formation
- Positive-real function in mathematics
- Programmed ribosomal frameshifting during mRNA translation
- Pseudorandom function family
- Pulse repetition frequency

== Organizations ==
- Polícia Rodoviária Federal, the Federal Highway Police of Brazil
- Progeria Research Foundation

== Business ==
- Pasture, rangeland, and forage insurance, a type of crop insurance for livestock growers

== Other uses ==
- Perfect (grammar), a tense
