= Acrogeria =

- Other names: Acrogeria, Gottron type, Gottron's syndrome
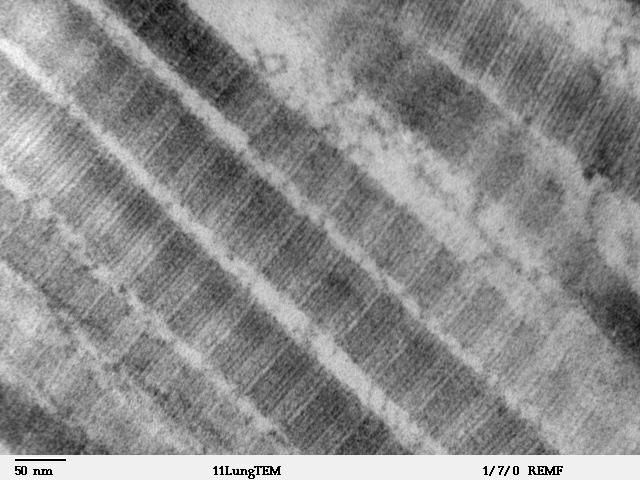
- Fibers of Collagen Type I - TEM
- Specialty: Dermatology
- Usual onset: Childhood
- Duration: Lifelong
- Causes: Genetic
- Differential diagnosis: Werner's syndrome
- Prognosis: Normal life expectancy

Acrogeria (Gottron's syndrome) is a skin condition characterized by premature aging, typically in the form of unusually fragile, thin skin on the hands and feet (distal extremities).

This is one of the classic congenital premature aging syndromes, occurring early in life, others being pangeria (Werner's syndrome) and progeria (Hutchinson–Gilford's syndrome), and was described in 1940. Acrogeria was characterized by Heinrich Gottron, when he noticed premature cutaneous aging localized on the hands and feet in two brothers. The problem had been present since birth.

Onset is often in early childhood, it progresses over the next few years and then remains stable over time with morphology, colour and site remaining constant. A bruising tendency has been observed. Mutations in the COL3A1 gene, located at chromosome 2q31–q32, have been reported in varied phenotypes, including acrogeria and vascular rupture in Ehlers–Danlos' syndrome (more especially type IV).

== Presentation ==
The most characteristic symptom of acrogeria is thin, atrophic skin with mottled pigmentation and telangiectasia, most severe in the limbs and extremities. This is accompanied by easy bruising, hyperkeratosis, and a loss of subcutaneous fat, which is replaced by connective tissue. Patients have a facies with a pinched face, hollow cheeks, prominent eyes without exophthalmos, a beak-like nose and thin lips. Though the hair and nails are normal in many cases, alopecia and nail dystrophies, such as onychogryphosis and koilonychia, have been reported. Stature is short in some patients and normal in others. The general skeletal structure is unremarkable, but acrogeria results in delayed closure of the cranial sutures, notching of the mandible, and micrognathia; and may also coincide with spina bifida, clubfoot and congenital dislocation of the hips. Sexual development, including the development of secondary sex characteristics, is normal, and so is intelligence. There is no correlation of acrogeria with metabolic, opthamological or cardiovascular disorders, and patients have a normal life expectancy. Similarities between the clinical features of acrogeria and Werner's syndrome have been observed.

== See also ==
- Hutchinson–Gilford syndrome
- List of cutaneous conditions
