= Bystander Revolution =

Anti-bullying organization

- Founded: 2014 in Seattle, Washington
- Founder: MacKenzie Scott
- Purpose: Bullying
- Location: United States
- Method: Bystander intervention
- Owner: Bystander Revolution, LLC
- Website: bystanderrevolution.org

Bystander Revolution is an anti-bullying organization founded in 2014 that provides advice on bystander intervention. It was founded by author MacKenzie Scott.

== Ambassadors ==
Actor Lily Collins became Bystander Revolution's first ambassador in 2014.

The organization announced on June 8, 2015 that Monica Lewinsky had joined the organization as an ambassador and strategic advisor following her speeches for TED and the Forbes Under 30 Summit.

The Youth Ambassador Program is a group of students who engage in outreach with other students and promote the organization's social media initiatives. Notable Youth Ambassadors include Hannah Alper, a motivational speaker, blogger, and activist; Carleigh O'Connell, whose story about standing up to her body shaming bullies went viral in 2014; and Shereen Pimentel, who was crowned Miss America's Outstanding Teen (New Jersey) in 2015 with the anti-bullying platform "Words Hurt, Erase the Hate".

== Events ==
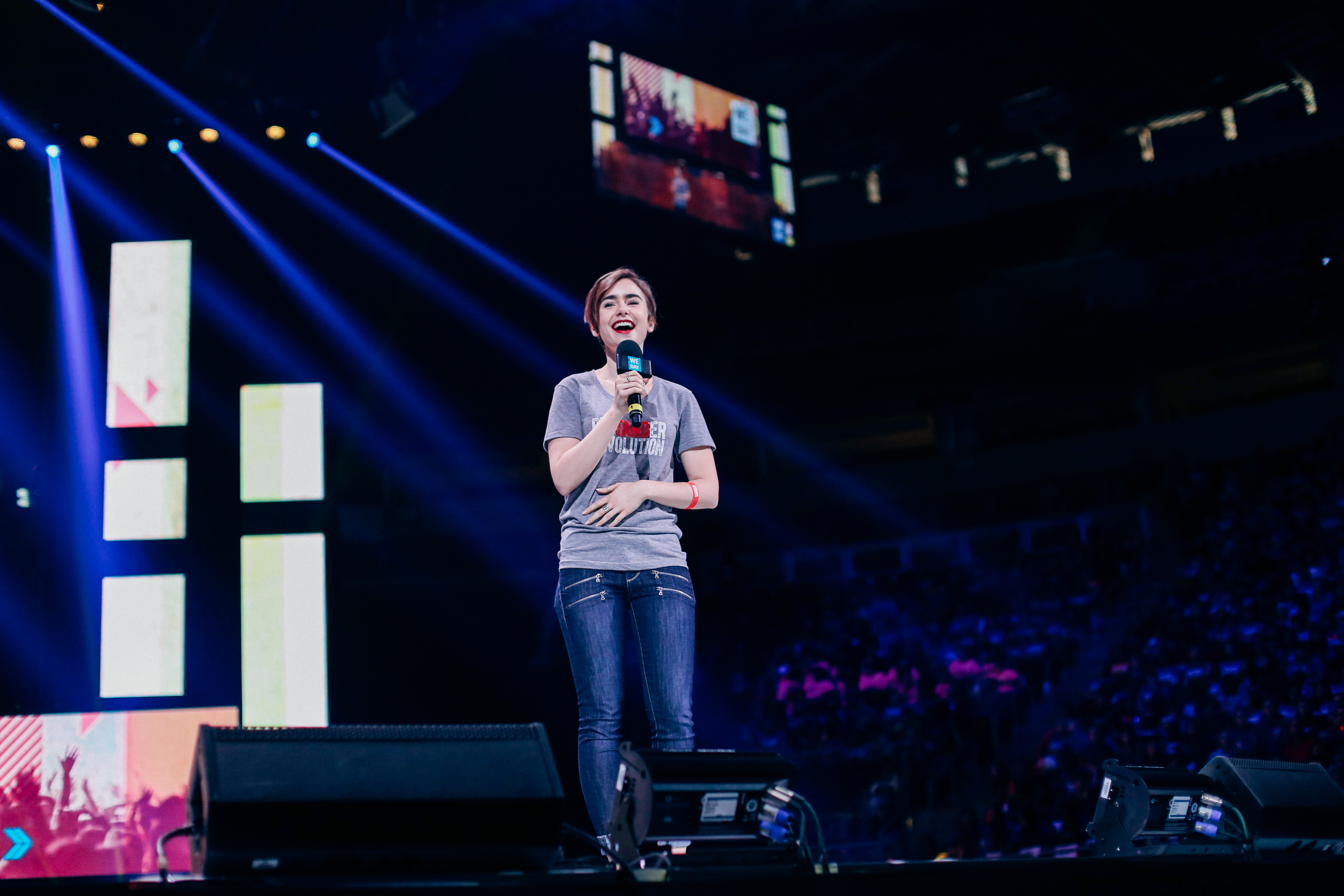
Bystander Revolution Ambassador Lily Collins delivers a speech at We Day Seattle, April 23, 2015.

On April 23, 2015, Bystander Revolution was featured at We Day Seattle 2015. Ambassador Lily Collins delivered a speech to the KeyArena audience about the power of consistent, simple actions to effect change and shift the culture of bullying toward kindness.

Coinciding with We Day Seattle 2015, Bystander Revolution launched a Twitter campaign called #standkind, in which users participate to compliment someone by Tweets.

On May 23, 2015, Bystander Revolution teamed up with Dance Free Movement for an event in honor of "Dancing Man". Sean O'Brien received support after being shamed on the internet for being overweight. Moby delayed the event, Pharrell Williams initiated a dance flash mob, Tatyana Ali served as the host, and Monica Lewinsky and Andrew W.K. as the presenters.

For National Bullying Prevention Month in October 2015, Bystander Revolution introduced Month of Action, a 31-day campaign taking individuals to defuse bullying with daily challenges. Each challenge was hosted by a Bystander Revolution ambassador, contributor, or partner organization. Lewinsky, Collins, Salma Hayek, Olivia Wilde, Shonda Rhimes, Rashida Jones, Bradley Cooper, Lizzie Velasquez, Moby, Alan Cumming, Emmy Rossum, Tyson Chandler, Andy Cohen, Jamie Lee Curtis, Michael J. Fox, Drew Lynch, and Melissa Joan Hart hosted the daily challenges.

== Methods ==
Bystander Revolution provides crowdsourced advice and potential actions to take against bullying, as well as free multimedia lessons on anti-bullying topics for educators. It is modeled on the idea that peer-to-peer advice can be uniquely encouraging and helpful for individuals seeking solutions to bullying. For this reason, the advice and resources compiled on its site were acquired by crowdsourcing and by contributions from advisors presented in more than 300 videos on the website.

The anti-bullying tips are crowdsourced from the organization's partners, such as Common Sense Media, MTV's Look Different, No Bully, and PACER's National Bullying Prevention center.

== See also ==
- Bullying
- Cyberbullying
