= Nestor–Guillermo progeria syndrome =

- Other names: NGPS; PSCOO; Progeria syndrome childhood-onset with osteolysis
- Specialty: Medical genetics
- Symptoms: Premature ageing
- Causes: Mutations in the BANF1 gene on chromosome 11

Nestor–Guillermo progeria syndrome (NGPS) is an extremely rare autosomal recessive progeroid disorder. Like other progeria syndromes, it is characterized by premature aging with an aged physical appearance, osteolysis (destruction or loss of bone tissue), osteoporosis (a disease that makes bones weak and brittle), scoliosis (abnormal lateral curvature of the spine), and lipoatrophy (loss of subcutaneous fat tissue). What distinguishes NGPS from other progeroid syndromes is the absence of atherosclerotic, cardiovascular, and metabolic symptoms or complications, which means that affected individuals may have a potentially longer lifespan than those with classic progeria. In place of those complications, NGPS presents additional features including joint stiffness, growth retardation, facial dysmorphisms, wide cranial sutures, micrognathia (an abnormally small lower jaw), atrophic skin, and a high risk of severe skeletal abnormalities.

== Clinical features ==
Hallmark features of NGPS include:

- Early childhood onset of failure to thrive, short stature, and delayed growth
- Sparse or absent hair, thin limbs, and decreased subcutaneous fat
- Facial dysmorphism
- Skeletal involvement: progressive bone loss (osteolysis), osteoporosis, scoliosis, stiff joints and contractures, and a high risk of fractures

== Genetics ==
NGPS is caused by mutations in the BANF1 gene, located on chromosome 11q13.1, and is inherited in an autosomal recessive pattern.

BANF1 encodes a small chromatin- and nuclear envelope-associated protein (BAF) that binds double-stranded DNA and interacts with nuclear envelope proteins. In NGPS, the A12T mutation — a homozygous missense mutation — does not appear to destabilize the protein but reduces its affinity for binding DNA. Recent data indicate that the A12T mutation weakens the interaction between BAF and lamin A/C, causing increased nuclear envelope fragility and more frequent re-ruptures despite ongoing repair. These nuclear envelope defects likely underlie the accelerated aging phenotype, as cells may accumulate damage more rapidly and fail to maintain nuclear structure, leading to downstream defects in the skeleton, connective tissues, and other systems. Because so few cases have been described, other variants may exist, but to date the A12T substitution is the only well-documented one.

== Discovery ==
Under the assumption of an autosomal recessive mode of inheritance, Puente conducted exon enrichment and massively parallel sequencing on DNA samples from the proband — the first individual in a family to be identified as having a genetic disorder or trait — and both parents of a Spanish family whose child had an atypical progeroid syndrome and had tested negative for mutations in the LMNA and ZMPSTE24 genes. They identified four variants, three of which were homozygous in the proband and heterozygous in both parents, located within a lengthy, continuous region of homozygosity on chromosome 11q13.

The syndrome was first identified in twin brothers named Néstor and Guillermo, who were born in Spain. Although seemingly healthy at birth, they began aging rapidly from around age two. By the age of ten, they had lost their hair, developed wrinkled skin, experienced weakening bones, and showed minimal increases in stature — all hallmarks of progeria. However, their physicians were unable to classify their condition within any known progeroid syndrome, as they lacked cardiovascular abnormalities and did not carry the genetic mutations associated with other described progeroid syndromes. Genetic testing ultimately revealed a shared mutation in the BANF1 gene that had not previously been associated with any known syndrome, leading to the recognition of NGPS as a novel progeroid condition. By the time of the 2011 publication formally describing the syndrome, the brothers were between 20 and 30 years old.

The phenotype of these patients is notable in that, at ages 32 and 24 respectively, neither had developed hypertriglyceridemia, diabetes mellitus, or cardiovascular damage. Their quality of life is, however, significantly affected by severe skeletal abnormalities.

Although NGPS is classified as a chronic condition that progresses more slowly than other forms of progeria, it remains a serious disorder.

While A12T mutant BANF1 mRNA levels were found to be comparable to those of wild-type patients, BANF1 A12T protein was detected at significantly lower levels, according to Puente et al. A subsequent study proposed that the A12T mutation did not render the protein unstable and that the reduced protein levels were an artifact of altered antigenicity toward the BANF1 antibody. The researchers therefore reasoned that the NGPS phenotype is more likely explained by functional effects of the mutation on protein activity.

== Comparison with related syndromes ==
NGPS differs from other progeroid syndromes in several important respects. Unlike Hutchinson–Gilford progeria syndrome (HGPS), which is caused by mutations in the LMNA gene and results in severe cardiovascular disease early in life, NGPS is caused by autosomal recessive mutations in BANF1 and does not involve vascular complications. Instead, NGPS primarily affects the skeleton, producing severe bone disorders including scoliosis, osteolysis, and osteoporosis that significantly limit mobility but do not reduce life expectancy to the same degree as HGPS.

Werner syndrome, sometimes called "adult progeria," presents later in life and results from mutations in the WRN gene; its features include cataracts, diabetes, and an elevated risk of cancer. Cockayne syndrome, caused by defects in DNA repair, results in neurological impairment and extreme sensitivity to sunlight.

These comparisons illustrate how distinct genetic pathways give rise to premature aging disorders that affect different organ systems. Understanding these differences among progeroid syndromes helps clarify the particular challenges posed by NGPS and underscores the need for treatment strategies tailored to its specific molecular and clinical profile.

== Management and therapy ==
There is currently no specific treatment for NGPS. Care focuses primarily on relieving symptoms and maintaining mobility and bone health through orthopedic intervention, physical therapy, and nutritional support such as calcium and vitamin D supplementation.

Lonafarnib, a farnesyltransferase inhibitor (FTI), has shown benefit in related progeroid disorders. It works by blocking an enzyme that attaches a farnesyl lipid group to certain proteins, including defective forms of lamin A in HGPS, thereby preventing abnormal proteins from damaging the nuclear membrane and allowing cells to function more normally. Clinical studies have shown that lonafarnib can improve vascular health, strengthen bones, and extend lifespan in children with HGPS. Although NGPS involves a different gene (BANF1) and lacks cardiovascular complications, lonafarnib's mechanism of action offers insight into potential future therapies for NGPS by targeting related cellular aging pathways.
