= Wiedemann–Rautenstrauch syndrome =

- Other names: Neonatal progeroid syndrome
- This condition is inherited in an autosomal recessive manner.
- Specialty: Endocrinology

Wiedemann–Rautenstrauch (WR) syndrome (German pronunciation: [ˈviːdəman ˈʁaʊtn̩ʃtʁaʊx]), also known as neonatal progeroid syndrome, is a rare autosomal recessive progeroid syndrome. There have been over 30 cases of WR. WR is associated with abnormalities in bone maturation, and lipids and hormone metabolism.

== Presentation ==
Affected individuals exhibit intrauterine and postnatal growth retardation, leading to short stature and an aged appearance from birth. They have physical abnormalities including a large head (macrocephaly), sparse hair, prominent scalp veins, inward-folded eyelid (entropion), widened anterior fontanelles, hollow cheeks (malar hypoplasia), general loss of fat tissues under the skin (lipoatrophy), delayed tooth eruption, abnormal hair pattern (hypotrichosis), beaked nose, mild to severe intellectual disabilities, and dysmorphism.

== Genetics ==
This condition has been associated with mutations in the POLR3A gene. This gene is located on the long arm of chromosome 10 (10q22.3).

This gene encodes the largest subunit (A) of the DNA directed RNA polymerase III. This subunit includes the catalytic site of RNA polymerase III.

Mutations in this gene have been associated with hypogonadotropic hypogonadism and hypomyelinating leukodystrophy with or without oligodontia.

== Diagnosis ==
=== Differential diagnosis ===
Marfan lipodystrophy syndrome (MFLS) has sometimes been confused with Wiedemann–Rautenstrauch syndrome, since the Marfanoid features are progressive and sometimes incomplete.

MFLS is caused by mutations near the 3'-terminus of FBN1 that cause a deficiency of the protein hormone asprosin and progeroid-like symptoms with reduced subcutaneous white adipose tissue.

== History ==
WR was first reported by Rautenstrauch and Snigula in 1977, and the earliest reports made subsequently have been by Hans-Rudolf Wiedemann in 1979, Devos in 1981, and Rudin in 1988.
