= Asprosin =

Glucose-regulating hormone

Fibrillin 1

Identifiers
- Symbol: FBN1
- NCBI gene: 2200
- HGNC: 3603
- OMIM: 134797
- RefSeq: NP_000129
- UniProt: P35555

Other data
- Locus: Chr. 15 q21.1
Search for
- Structures: Swiss-model
- Domains: InterPro

Asprosin is a fasting-induced hormone encoded by the FBN1 gene and derived from the cleavage of the fibrillin-1 protein, a structural component of the extracellular matrix. It is primarily produced and secreted by white adipose tissue. As a peripherally derived hormone, asprosin actively crosses the blood-brain barrier (BBB) to exert central effects on metabolic and behavioral regulation. It stimulates the liver to release glucose into the bloodstream during fasting, ensuring energy availability, and influences appetite and body weight regulation by acting on hypothalamic neurons. Dysregulation of asprosin levels has been implicated in metabolic disorders such as obesity and diabetes, making it a promising target for therapeutic interventions.

== Discovery ==
Asprosin was first identified by Dr. Atul Chopra and colleagues at Baylor College of Medicine during their study of Marfanoid–progeroid–lipodystrophy syndrome (MPL), also known as neonatal progeroid syndrome (NPS), a rare genetic disorder caused by mutations in the FBN1 gene. These mutations produce truncated profibrillin-1 protein, resulting in two key effects: the production of a mutant fibrillin-1 protein and significantly reduced plasma asprosin levels due to a dominant-negative mechanism. The discovery of asprosin's role as a fasting-induced glucogenic hormone, stimulating hepatic glucose release, stemmed from the observation of low plasma insulin levels in the two patients. A subsequent study by Chopra and colleagues investigated the patients' extreme thinness and abnormally low appetite, uncovering asprosin's additional role as an orexigenic hormone that regulates appetite through hypothalamic neurons. To further investigate the condition, Chopra and colleagues developed a mouse model carrying the MPL mutation, which faithfully phenocopied the human disorder. These mice exhibited the same features as the patients, including low plasma asprosin levels, extreme thinness, reduced appetite, and resistance to diet-induced obesity and diabetes. This model confirmed the role of asprosin in regulating appetite and body weight through its orexigenic effects on hypothalamic neurons and demonstrated its broader implications in metabolic health. The findings not only provided insights into the pathophysiology of MPL but also underscored asprosin's therapeutic potential in obesity and diabetes.

== Profibrillin cleavage and asprosin secretion ==
The asprosin mechanism begins with the cleavage of profibrillin-1. While the specific cellular location of profibrillin-1 cleavage is largely unknown, it is speculated to occur between the trans-Golgi network and the cell surface, or upon fibrillin-1 secretion. Furin cleaves asprosin at the R-C-K/R-R motif in the C-terminal domain. This cleavage event is important because it is required for the incorporation of fibrillin-1 into the extracellular matrix. Since furin is expressed in a plethora of cell lines and tissues, the presence or lack of this enzyme does not narrow down the possible locations of asprosin secretion.

Evidence suggests that asprosin is secreted from white adipose tissue, which accounts for 5–50% of human body weight and is already known to secrete adipokines such as leptin and adiponectin. While FBN1 is expressed in many tissues, its highest expression in both humans and mice is in white adipose. However, since FBN1 (and thus, asprosin) is widely expressed in many human tissues, it is likely that white adipose is not the only source of plasma asprosin. There has been evidence connecting asprosin secretion from wild-type human dermal fibroblasts suggesting that it may be secreted from skin. It was also discovered that MIN6 pancreatic β-cells and human primary islets containing β-cells secrete asprosin and that secretion is induced by palmitate in a dose-dependent manner. Asprosin has also been detected in saliva samples.

== Function ==
Once in the circulation, asprosin targets the liver and the brain.

=== Hepatic function ===
The liver stores excess glucose in the form of glycogen after a meal, in response to insulin. Between meals (or during fasting), the liver is stimulated to break down this glycogen to release glucose (glycogenolysis) and also synthesizes new glucose (gluconeogenesis); this glucose is released into the bloodstream to maintain normal function of the brain and other organs that burn glucose for energy. Glycogenolysis and gluconeogenesis are stimulated by hormones such as glucagon that activate the cyclic AMP pathway in liver hepatocytes, and this cAMP promotes activation of metabolic enzymes leading to glucose production and release; asprosin appears to utilize this same system of control. Asprosin was reported to stimulate glucose release from hepatocytes, and plasma levels of asprosin in obese high-fat-fed mice have been reported to nearly double. However, in a study in 2019, a pharma replication group reported their inability to replicate these two key observations using recombinant asprosin, suggesting that issues with reagent purity may have been responsible for the effect observed in the initial asprosin study. Nevertheless, a third group reported in 2019 that they had identified the liver receptor for asprosin, OR4M1, an olfactory receptor family GPCR, and showed that plasma asprosin levels increased with fasting and with diet-induced obesity, and confirmed asprosin's effect on stimulation of hepatic glucose production, replicating all facets of the original study. A later vertebrate study identified protein tyrosine phosphatase receptor F (PTPRF), a member of the LAR family, as a conserved cognate receptor for the glucogenic actions of asprosin. In zebrafish, two Ptprf paralogs (ptprfa/b) are expressed in liver, bind asprosin with nanomolar affinity, and are required for asprosin-induced hyperglycemia and upregulation of gluconeogenic genes; soluble Ptprf ligand-binding domains neutralize the glucogenic effects and lower basal glucose, while ptprfa/b knockout fish show hypoglycemia and a blunted response to asprosin but normal responses to glucagon. In mice, PTPRF is expressed in liver and binds asprosin; Ptprf-deficient animals exhibit impaired asprosin-induced glucose production and reduced hepatic G6pc and Pck1 induction, and Ptprf deletion improves glucose tolerance without altering Olfr734 expression. Mechanistically, the same study showed that asprosin promotes insulin receptor and Akt dephosphorylation via PTPRF, counteracting insulin's suppression of gluconeogenesis and suggesting that chronic asprosin–PTPRF signaling contributes to hepatic insulin resistance. Several other independent studies have confirmed asprosin's glucogenic function.

=== Central function ===
Asprosin can also exit the bloodstream and cross the blood–brain barrier to function in the brain. The first indication that asprosin was in fact a cerebrospinal fluid (CSF) protein, in addition to being a plasma protein, was the observation of asprosin in the CSF of rats at concentrations 5- to 10-fold lower than in the plasma. Additionally, intravenously introduced asprosin showed a dramatic ability to cross the blood–brain barrier and enter the CSF. Asprosin induces appetite via activation of orexigenic AgRP neurons and deactivation of anorexigenic POMC neurons in the arcuate nucleus of the hypothalamus. Asprosin's orexigenic effects are mediated through binding to protein tyrosine phosphatase receptor delta (PTPRD). Whole body deletion of Ptprd results in reduced appetite and extreme leanness (mirroring the effects of deficient asprosin) while selective loss of Ptprd in just AgRP neurons leads to reduced appetite and protection from diet-induced obesity. A Science Advances study titled "Asprosin promotes feeding through SK channel–dependent activation of AgRP neurons" served as a strong independent replication of the original discovery that asprosin increases appetite and body weight by activating hypothalamic AgRP neurons. It confirmed both the physiological effects—elevated food intake and weight gain following asprosin administration—and the originally proposed mechanism of AgRP neuron activation. In addition, it extended the mechanistic insight by showing that asprosin bound to Ptprd and inhibited SK3 potassium channels, thereby enhancing AgRP neuron excitability. Altogether, the study reinforced the reproducibility and biological significance of the asprosin-AgRP axis in appetite control. The vertebrate Ptprf study further confirmed this division of function between glucogenic and orexigenic receptors: in zebrafish, asprosin was shown to modulate feeding behavior, manipulations of Ptprf selectively altered glucose metabolism without affecting appetite, and Ptprd paralogs were required for the orexigenic effects of asprosin but not for its glucogenic actions, with Ptprd ligand-binding domains blocking appetite responses to asprosin without affecting hyperglycemia and ptprda/ptprdb knockouts impairing feeding responses while preserving glucogenic responses.

PTPRD is highly expressed throughout the brain, with particularly high levels in the cerebellum and cerebellar hemispheres, leading to the discovery of the cerebellum's role in thirst regulation. Researchers demonstrated that asprosin directly activates cerebellar Purkinje neurons to modulate fluid intake in a Ptprd-dependent manner, notably without affecting the well-established role of Purkinje neurons in motor coordination. This finding underscores a remarkable duality in asprosin's function: it regulates both thirst and appetite by acting on the same receptor, PTPRD, while engaging distinct neuronal populations to orchestrate these vital survival behaviors.

== Classification ==
Asprosin is a protein hormone, but is unique in its generation as the C-terminal cleavage product of a large extracellular matrix protein. Therefore, it has been postulated to belong to a new protein hormone subclass: caudamins. It has been placed in this subclass along with the hormones: endostatin, endotrophin and placensin. Members of this class are derived from a cleavage event that also generates a much larger, functionally unrelated, nonhormonal protein. The subclass was named caudamins, from the Latin word cauda meaning 'tail'.

== Clinical significance ==
=== Asprosin ===
Obesity is characterized by an overall increase in adiposity and, given that asprosin is secreted by adipose tissue, it is not surprising that both obese humans and mice show pathologically elevated levels of asprosin compared with control subjects. Patients presenting with insulin resistance and obesity have elevated serum levels of asprosin, and female patients with polyendocrine metabolic ovarian syndrome (PMOS) have particularly high serum levels. Obese patients undergoing bariatric surgery for weight loss show decreased asprosin levels in serum after surgery.

Asprosin-induced hyperphagia and hepatic glucose production could therefore be mechanisms that drive development of metabolic syndrome.

=== Fibrillin-1 ===
Fibrillin-1 is important for the formation of elastic fibers in connective tissues, and patients with mutations in FBN1 gene exhibit Marfan syndrome. Individuals with Marfanoid–progeroid–lipodystrophy syndrome (MPL) are deficient in asprosin due to mutations affecting the carboxy terminus of the profibrillin-1 protein and its processing into fibrillin-1 and asprosin.

== Therapeutic potential ==
In a test of pharmacologic asprosin depletion in animals, preliminary results raised the possibility of its use, therapeutically, in treating type 2 diabetes and obesity. For instance, Chopra and coworkers observed that when monoclonal antibodies targeting asprosin were injected into diabetic mice, blood glucose and insulin levels improved.

=== Monoclonal anti-asprosin antibody ===
Mishra and colleagues have demonstrated that anti-asprosin mAbs (monoclonal antibody) are a dual-effect therapy that targets the two key pillars of metabolic syndrome – overnutrition and plasma glucose burden. Specifically, anti-asprosin mAbs have been shown to reduce blood glucose, appetite, and body weight in various diet-induced and genetic models of metabolic syndrome. These findings have led to an effort to optimize and develop clinical-grade anti-asprosin mAbs for use in humans. Asprosin has also been reported to cross the blood–brain barrier to regulate neurons in the hypothalamus of the brain known to regulate hunger and satiety, and inhibiting asprosin in obese mice reduced feeding and led to decreased body weight.
