= Marfanoid–progeroid–lipodystrophy syndrome =

- Other names: Marfan lipodystrophy syndrome (MFLS)
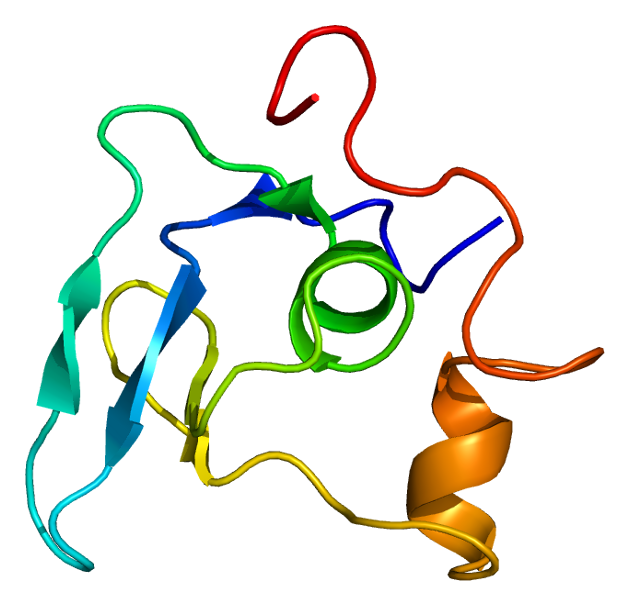
- A mutation in the protein profibrillin, encoded by FBN1, is the cause of Marfanoid–progeroid–lipodystrophy syndrome.
- Symptoms: Unable To Gain Weight.

Marfanoid–progeroid–lipodystrophy syndrome (MPL), also known as Marfan lipodystrophy syndrome (MFLS) or progeroid fibrillinopathy, is an extremely rare medical condition which manifests as a variety of symptoms including those usually associated with Marfan syndrome, an appearance resembling that seen in neonatal progeroid syndrome (NPS; also known as Wiedemann–Rautenstrauch syndrome), and severe partial lipodystrophy. It is a genetic condition that is caused by mutations in the FBN1 gene, which encodes profibrillin, and affects the cleavage products of profibrillin, fibrillin-1, a fibrous structural protein, and asprosin, a glucogenic protein hormone. As of 2016, fewer than 10 cases of the condition have been reported. Lizzie Velásquez and Abby Solomon have become known publicly through the media for having the condition.

In addition to severe lipodystrophy (loss of adipose tissue), individuals with MPL show a concomitant marked loss of lean tissue mass, which also contributes to their "skinny" appearance. Based on visual inspection, it was originally thought that the lipodystrophy associated with MPL was generalized. However, it appears in fact to be partial, being confined to the face, distal extremities, and the paravertebral and lateral regions of the buttocks. Normal amounts of subcutaneous fat are found in the torso over the chest and abdomen. As such, the breasts are normal in females with MPL.

Individuals with MPL have an appearance of being prematurely aged, but this is not due to actual early aging and is instead due to their paucity of subcutaneous fat. As such, MPL is not truly a form of progeria.

In 2016, it was discovered that the partial lipodystrophy associated with MPL is caused by loss of the C-terminal domain cleavage product of profibrillin and novel glucogenic protein hormone, which has been named asprosin. Due to asprosin deficiency, individuals with MPL eat less, and do not gain weight or develop symptoms of diabetes like insulin resistance. MPL patients burn less energy than normal individuals, but also consume less, and their net energy balance is moderately reduced. In contrast to MPL patients, whose asprosin is undetectable in the blood, individuals with obesity and diabetes have elevated levels of asprosin. As such, FBN1 has been nicknamed the "thin gene", and drug development for targeted inhibition of asprosin signaling is considered to be an "unusually promising" potential therapeutic route in the treatment of obesity and diabetes.
