= Progerin =

Mutant lamin A protein

Identifiers
- Symbol: LMNA
- Alt. names: Lamin AΔ50
- NCBI gene: 4000
- HGNC: 6636
- OMIM: 150330
- UniProt: P02545-6

Other data
- Locus: Chr. 1 q22
- Wikidata: Q7248344
Search for
- Structures: Swiss-model
- Domains: InterPro

Progerin is a truncated version of the lamin A protein responsible for the pathological changes seen in Hutchinson–Gilford progeria syndrome (HGPS). Progerin is produced by a sporadic mutation, a single-nucleotide polymorphism named "C1824T" which occurs in the lamin A gene (LMNA). Progerin causes structural instability in the wall of the cell nucleus and this is related to premature aging.

== Formation and structure ==
Diagram of the action of a protein coding gene

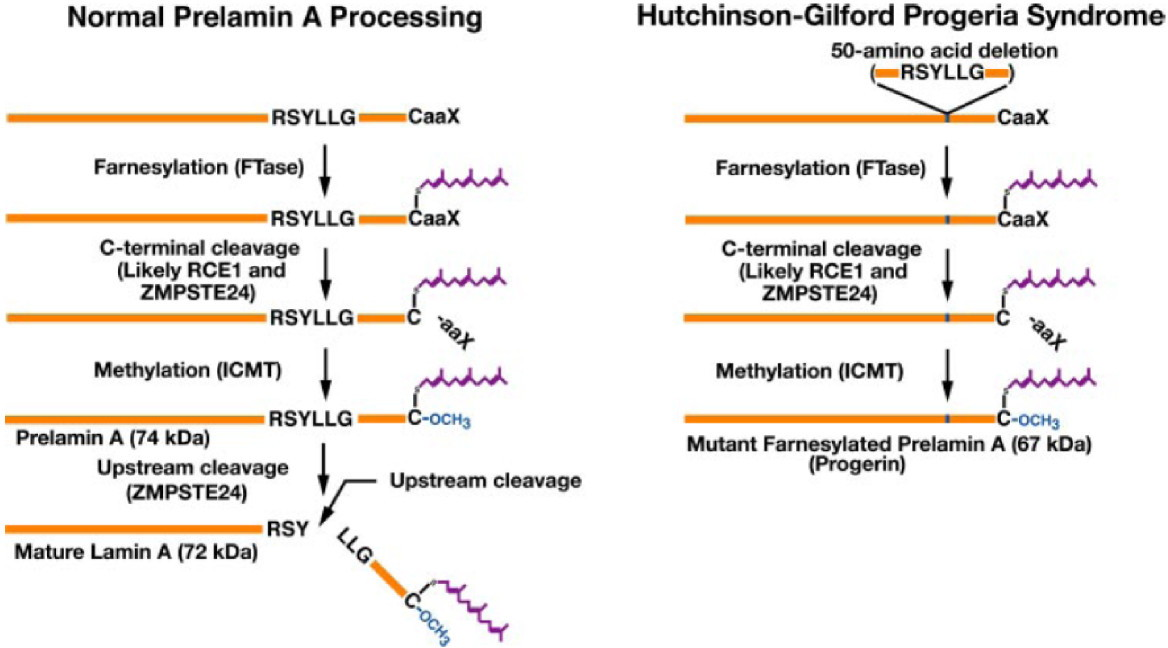
Prelamin A processing and the defective gene Progerin (right) without the 50 amino acid sequence processing.

Progerin is most commonly produced by the c.1824C>T mutation in exon 11 of the LMNA gene. This synonymous mutation changes the glycine codon GGC to GGT without changing the encoded amino acid (p.Gly608Gly). However, it activates a cryptic splice site, resulting in an abnormally spliced messenger RNA that encodes a prelamin A protein lacking 50 amino acids near its C-terminus.

The deleted region includes the cleavage site required for the final processing step carried out by the protease ZMPSTE24. Consequently, progerin retains its farnesylated and carboxymethylated C-terminus, which is normally removed during the maturation of lamin A.

== Cellular effects ==
Lamin A constitutes a major structural component of the lamina, a scaffold of proteins found inside the nuclear membrane of cells; progerin does not properly integrate into the lamina, which disrupts the scaffold structure and leads to significant disfigurement of the nucleus, characterized by a globular shape. Progerin activates genes that regulate stem cell differentiation via the Notch signaling pathway. Progerin increases the frequency of unrepaired double-strand breaks in DNA following exposure to ionizing radiation. In addition, overexpression of progerin is correlated with an increase in non-homologous end joining relative to homologous recombination among those DNA double-strand breaks that are repaired. Furthermore, the fraction of homologous recombination events occurring by gene conversion is increased. These findings suggest that the normal untruncated nuclear lamina has an important role in the proper repair of DNA double-strand breaks.

Progerin can impair DNA replication, causing replication stress and contributing to the accumulation of DNA damage and premature cellular senescence.

== Association with ageing ==
=== Hutchinson–Gilford progeria syndrome ===
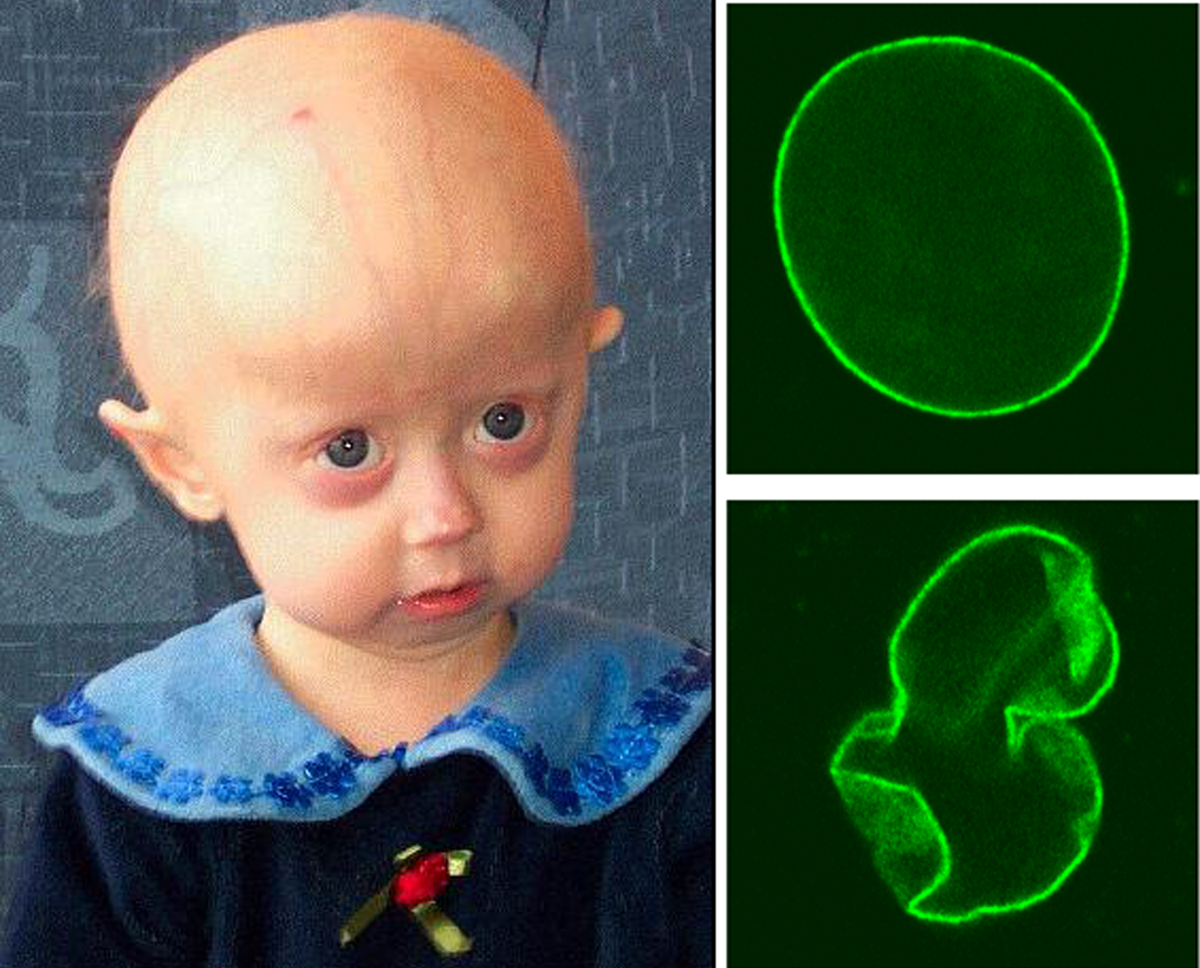
Hutchinson Gilford Progeria Syndrome facial characteristics and cell nucleus wall shape.

Approximately 90% of individuals with Hutchinson–Gilford progeria syndrome (HGPS) are heterozygous for the c.1824C>T pathogenic variant in LMNA. Most remaining cases involve other progerin-producing variants in exon 11 or intron 11. HGPS is an autosomal dominant disorder that is usually caused by a de novo mutation.

=== Normal ageing ===
Progerin, which has been linked to normal ageing, is produced in healthy individuals via sporadic use of the cryptic splice site.

== Therapeutic approaches ==
Lonafarnib is a farnesyltransferase inhibitor that inhibits the farnesylation of progerin. In November 2020, it became the first drug approved by the US Food and Drug Administration to reduce the risk of death in patients with Hutchinson–Gilford progeria syndrome.

In cultured fibroblasts from patients with HGPS, rapamycin has been shown to enhance progerin degradation, reduce nuclear blebbing, and delay the onset of cellular senescence.
