= Progeria =

Genetic disorder that causes early aging

- Other names: Hutchinson–Gilford progeria syndrome (HGPS), progeria syndrome, Joseph syndrome
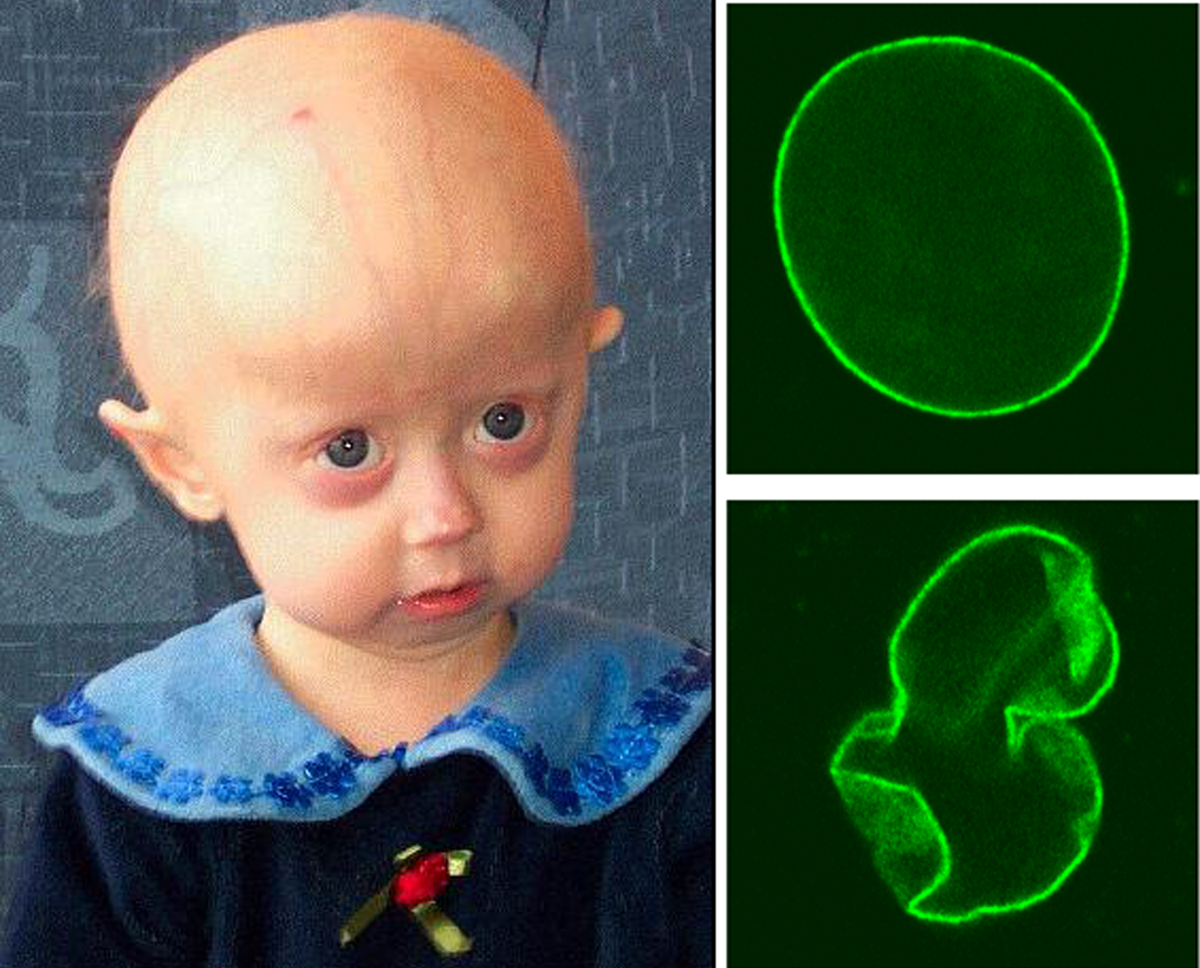
- A young girl with progeria (left). A healthy cell nucleus (right, top) and a progeric cell nucleus (right, bottom).
- Pronunciation: /proʊˈdʒɪəriə/
- Specialty: Medical genetics
- Symptoms: Growth delay, short height, small face, hair loss
- Complications: Heart disease, stroke, hip dislocations
- Usual onset: 9–24 months
- Causes: Genetic
- Diagnostic method: Based on symptoms, genetic tests
- Differential diagnosis: Hallermann–Streiff syndrome, Gottron's syndrome, Wiedemann–Rautenstrauch syndrome
- Treatment: Mostly symptomatic
- Medication: Lonafarnib
- Prognosis: Average age of death is 13 years, invariably fatal
- Frequency: Extremely rare: 1 in 18 million

Progeria (also Hutchinson–Gilford syndrome or Hutchinson–Gilford progeroid syndrome; HGPS) is a type of progeroid syndrome. A single gene mutation is responsible for causing progeria. The affected gene, known as lamin A (LMNA), makes a protein necessary for holding the cell nucleus together. When this gene mutates, an abnormal form of lamin A protein called progerin is produced. Progeroid syndromes are a group of diseases that cause individuals to age faster than usual. People born with progeria typically live until their mid- to late-teens or early twenties. Severe cardiovascular complications usually develop by puberty, later on resulting in death.

== Signs and symptoms ==
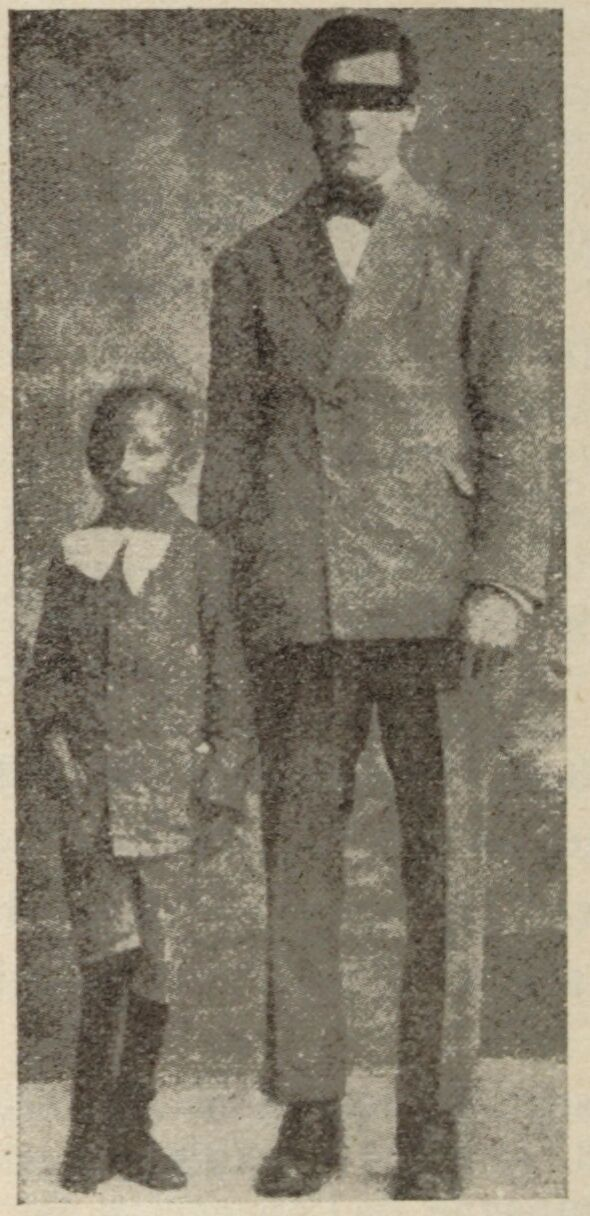
Progeria in a 19-year-old male (left), compared to male of the same age without progeria (right)

Most children with progeria appear normal at birth and during early infancy. Children with progeria usually develop the first symptoms during their first few months of life. The earliest symptoms may include a failure to thrive and a localized scleroderma-like skin condition. As a child ages past infancy, additional conditions become apparent, usually around 18–24 months. Limited growth, full-body alopecia (hair loss), and a distinctive appearance (a small face with a shallow, recessed jaw and a pinched nose) are all characteristics of progeria.

Signs and symptoms of this progressive disease tend to become more marked as the child ages. Later, the condition causes wrinkled skin, kidney failure, loss of eyesight, and atherosclerosis and other cardiovascular problems. Scleroderma, a hardening and tightening of the skin on trunk and extremities of the body, is prevalent. People diagnosed with this disorder usually have small, fragile bodies, like those of older adults. The head is usually large relative to the body, with a narrow, wrinkled face and a beak nose. Prominent scalp veins are noticeable (made more obvious by alopecia), as well as prominent eyes. Musculoskeletal degeneration causes loss of body fat and muscle, stiff joints, hip dislocations, and other symptoms generally absent in the non-elderly population. Individuals usually retain typical mental and motor function. Despite looking and aging physically at a rate 8 to 10 times faster than normal, children and young adults with progeria have normal-to-above-average intelligence and full, age-appropriate social development.

== Pathophysiology ==
Hutchinson–Gilford progeroid syndrome (HGPS) is an extremely rare autosomal dominant genetic disorder in which symptoms resembling aspects of aging are manifested at an early age. Its occurrence is usually the result of a sporadic germline mutation; although HGPS is genetically dominant, sufferers rarely live long enough to have children, preventing them from passing the disorder on in a hereditary manner.

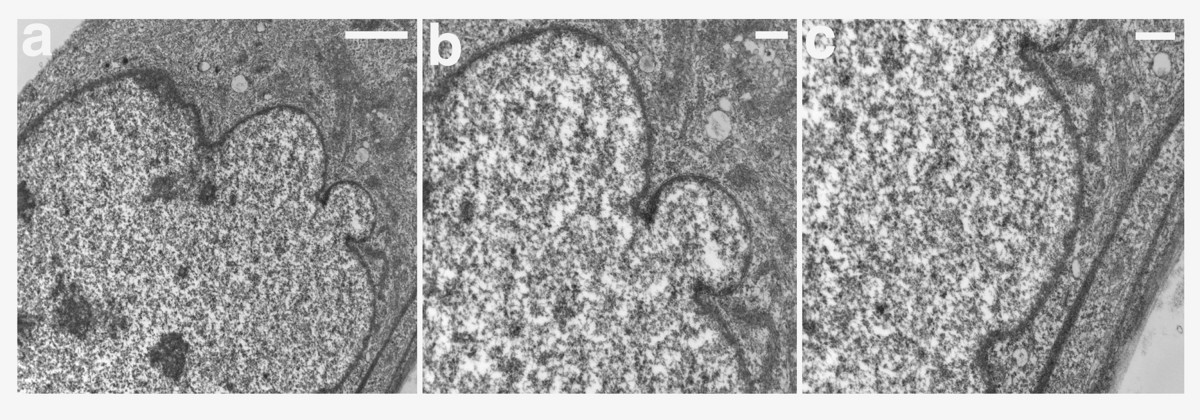
Ultrastructural analysis of the nuclear envelope in fibroblasts from a subject with HGPS. Low magnification transmission electron microscopic image of a passage 10 PT001 nucleus showed several herniations (a). Two higher-magnification images of the same nucleus at sites of blebs (b and c) showed a close apposition of the chromatin to the nuclear envelope. In a, b, and c, the nucleus is to the left. Scale bars correspond to 2 μm in panel a, and 500 nm in panels b and c.

HGPS is caused by mutations that weaken the structure of the cell nucleus, making normal cell division difficult. The histone mark H4K20me3 is involved and caused by de novo mutations that occur in a gene that encodes lamin A. Lamin A is made but is not processed properly. This poor processing creates an abnormal nuclear morphology and disorganized heterochromatin. Patients also do not have appropriate DNA repair, and they also have increased genomic instability.

In normal conditions, the LMNA gene codes for a structural protein called prelamin A, which undergoes a series of processing steps before attaining its final form, called lamin A. Prelamin A contains a "CAAX" where C is a cysteine, A an aliphatic amino acid, and X any amino acid. This motif at the carboxyl-termini of proteins triggers three sequential enzymatic modifications. First, protein farnesyltransferase catalyzes the addition of a farnesyl moiety to the cysteine. Second, an endoprotease that recognizes the farnesylated protein catalyzes the peptide bond's cleavage between the cysteine and -aaX. In the third step, isoprenylcysteine carboxyl methyltransferase catalyzes methylation of the carboxyl-terminal farnesyl cysteine. The farnesylated and methylated protein is transported through a nuclear pore to the interior of the nucleus. Once in the nucleus, the protein is cleaved by a protease called zinc metallopeptidase STE24 (ZMPSTE24), which removes the last 15 amino acids, which includes the farnesylated cysteine. After cleavage by the protease, prelamin A is referred to as lamin A. In most mammalian cells, lamin A, along with lamin B1, lamin B2, and lamin C, makes up the nuclear lamina, which provides shape and stability to the inner nuclear envelope.

Before the late 20th century, research on progeria yielded very little information about the syndrome. In 2003, the cause of progeria was discovered to be a point mutation in position 1824 of the LMNA gene, which replaces a cytosine with thymine. This mutation creates a 5' cryptic splice site within exon 11, resulting in a shorter than normal mRNA transcript. When this shorter mRNA is translated into protein, it produces an abnormal variant of the prelamin A protein, referred to as progerin. Progerin's farnesyl group cannot be removed because the ZMPSTE24 cleavage site is lacking from progerin, so the abnormal protein is permanently attached to the nuclear rim. One result is that the nuclear lamina does not provide the nuclear envelope with enough structural support, causing it to take on an abnormal shape. Since the support that the nuclear lamina normally provides is necessary for the organizing of chromatin during mitosis, weakening of the nuclear lamina limits the ability of the cell to divide. However, defective cell division is unlikely to be the main defect leading to progeria, particularly because children develop normally without any signs of disease until about one year of age. Farnesylated prelamin A variants also lead to defective DNA repair, which may play a role in the development of progeria. Progerin expression also leads to defects in the establishment of fibroblast cell polarity, which is also seen in physiological aging.

To date, over 1,400 SNPs in the LMNA gene are known. They can manifest as changes in mRNA, splicing, or protein amino acid sequence (e.g. Arg471Cys, Arg482Gln, Arg527Leu, Arg527Cys, and Ala529Val). Progerin may also play a role in normal human aging, since its production is activated in typical senescent cells. Unlike other "accelerated aging diseases", such as Werner syndrome, Cockayne syndrome, or xeroderma pigmentosum, progeria may not be directly caused by defective DNA repair. These diseases each cause changes in a few specific aspects of aging but never in every aspect at once, so they are often called "segmental progerias".

A 2003 report in Nature said that progeria may be a de novo dominant trait. It develops during cell division in a newly conceived zygote or in the gametes of one of the parents. It is caused by mutations in the LMNA (lamin A protein) gene on chromosome 1; the mutated form of lamin A is commonly known as progerin. One of the authors, Leslie Gordon, was a physician who did not know anything about progeria until her own son, Sam, was diagnosed at 22 months. Gordon and her husband, pediatrician Scott Berns, founded the Progeria Research Foundation.

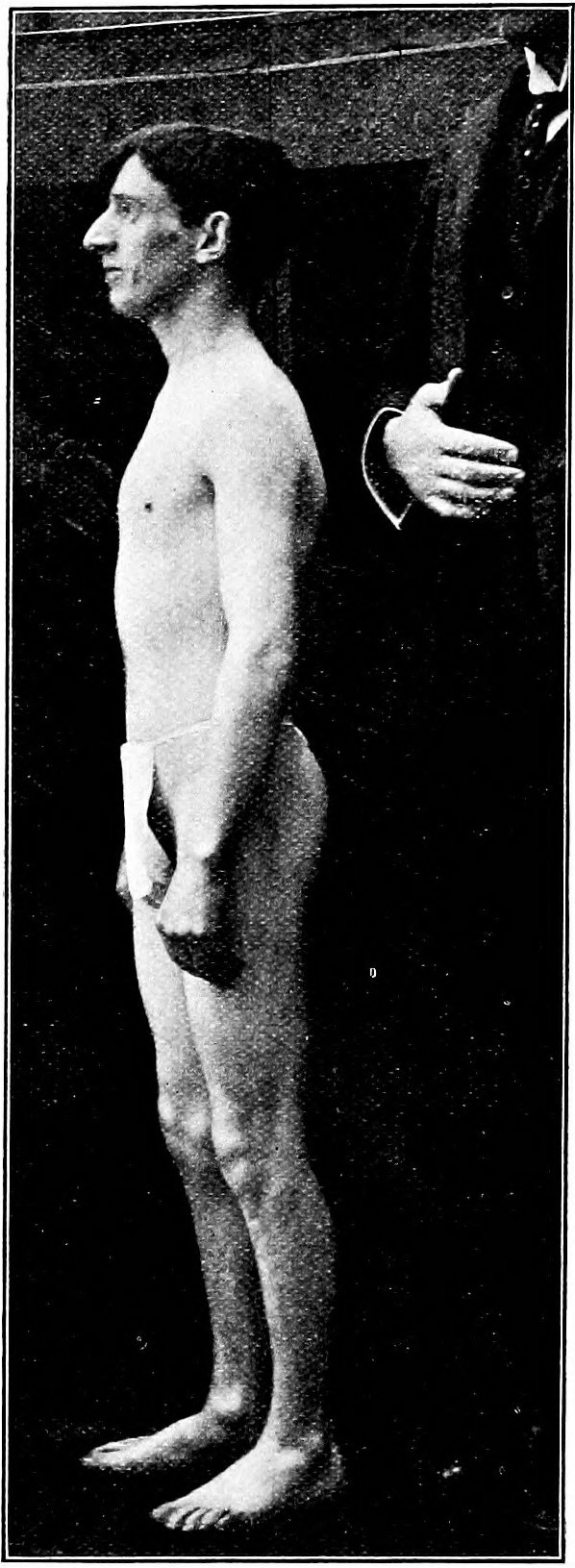
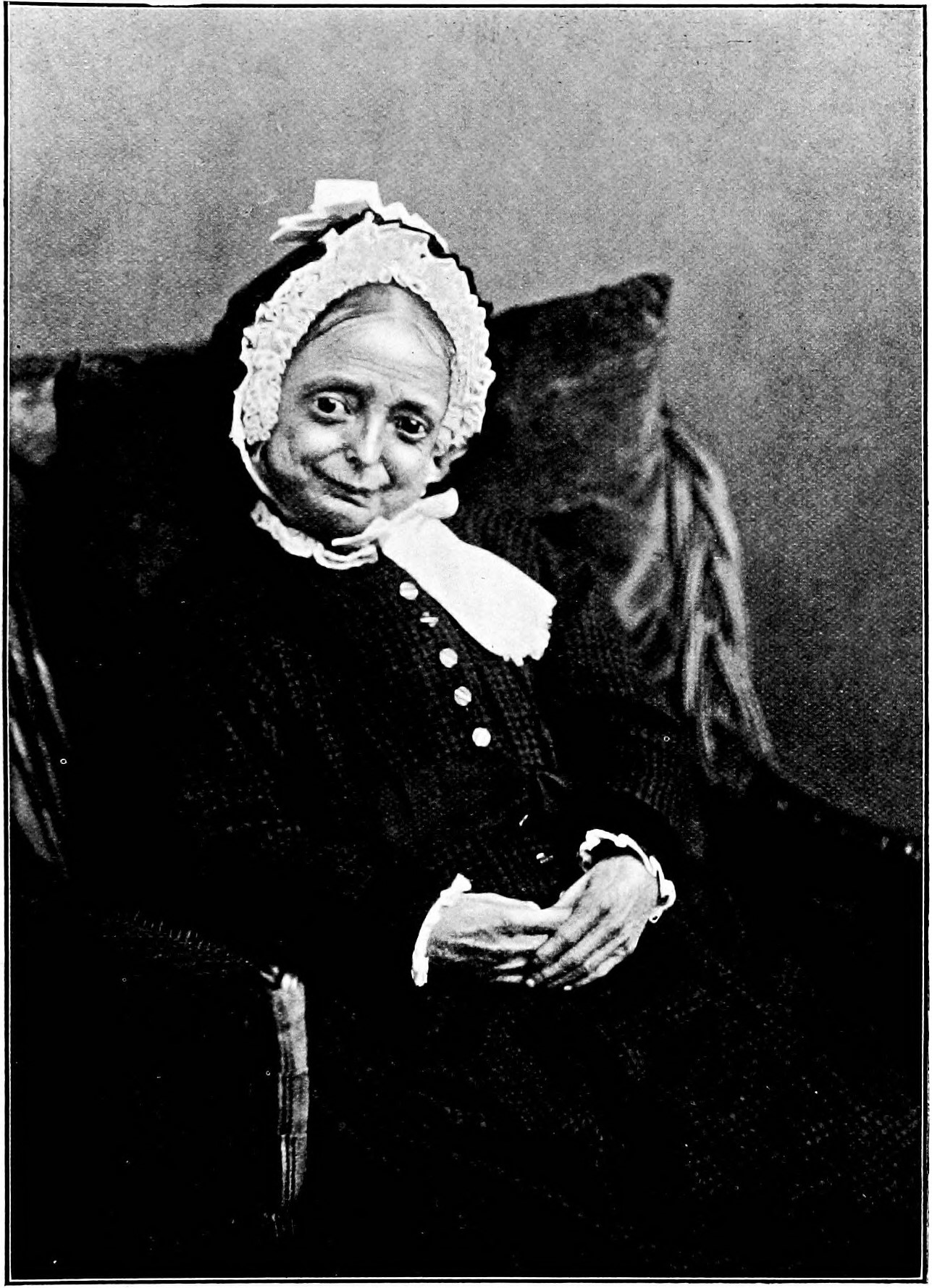
A male patient age 22 (top) and a female patient age 40 (bottom) both with atypical progeria

A subset of progeria patients with heterozygous mutations of LMNA have presented an atypical form of the condition, with initial symptoms not developing until late childhood or early adolescence. These patients have had longer lifespans than those with typical-onset progeria. This atypical form is extremely rare, with presentations of the condition varying between patients with even the same mutation. The general phenotype of atypical cases is consistent with typical progeria, but other factors (severity, onset, and lifespan) vary in presentation.

=== Lamin A ===
Lamin A is a major component of a protein scaffold on the inner edge of the nucleus called the nuclear lamina that helps organize nuclear processes such as RNA and DNA synthesis.

Prelamin A contains a CAAX box at the C-terminus of the protein (where C is a cysteine and A is any aliphatic amino acids). This ensures that the cysteine is farnesylated and allows prelamin A to bind membranes, specifically the nuclear membrane. After prelamin A has been localized to the cell nuclear membrane, the C-terminal amino acids, including the farnesylated cysteine, are cleaved off by a specific protease. The resulting protein, now lamin A, is no longer membrane-bound and carries out functions inside the nucleus.

In HGPS, the recognition site that the enzyme requires for cleavage of prelamin A to lamin A is mutated. Lamin A cannot be produced, and prelamin A builds up on the nuclear membrane, causing a characteristic nuclear blebbing. This results in the symptoms of progeria, although the relationship between the misshapen nucleus and the symptoms is not known.

A study that compared HGPS patient cells with the skin cells from young and elderly normal human subjects found similar defects in the HGPS and elderly cells, including down-regulation of certain nuclear proteins, increased DNA damage, and demethylation of histone, leading to reduced heterochromatin. Nematodes over their lifespan show progressive lamin changes comparable to HGPS in all cells but neurons and gametes. These studies suggest that lamin A defects are associated with normal aging.

=== Mitochondria ===
The presence of progerin also leads to the accumulation of dysfunctional mitochondria within the cell. These mitochondria are characterized by a swollen morphology, caused by a condensation of mtDNA and TFAM into the mitochondria, which is driven by a severe mitochondrial dysfunction (low mitochondrial membrane potential, low ATP production, low respiration capacity and high ROS production). Therefore, contributing substantially to the senescence phenotype. Although the explanation for this defective-mitochondria accumulation in progeria is yet to be elucidated, it has been proposed that low PGC1-α expression (important for mitochondrial biogenesis, maintenance and function) along with low LAMP2 protein level and lysosome number (both important for mitophagy: the degradation of defective mitochondria pathway), could be implicated.

== Diagnosis ==
Skin changes, abnormal growth, and loss of hair occur. These symptoms normally start appearing by one year of age. A genetic test for LMNA mutations can confirm the diagnosis of progeria. Prior to the advent of the genetic test, misdiagnosis was common.

=== Differential diagnosis ===
Other syndromes with similar symptoms (non-laminopathy progeroid syndromes) include:

- Acrogeria
- Berardinelli-Seip congenital lipodystrophy (congenital generalized lipodystrophy)
- Cockayne syndrome
- Ehlers–Danlos syndromes, progeroid form
- Gerodermia osteodysplastica
- Hallermann–Streiff syndrome
- Mandibuloacral dysplasia
- Neonatal progeroid syndrome (Wiedemann–Rautenstrauch syndrome)
- Nestor-Guillermo syndrome
- Penttinen syndrome
- Petty–Laxova–Weidemann progeroid syndrome
- POLR3A-related Wiedemann–Rautenstrauch syndrome
- PYCR1-related Wiedemann–Rautenstrauch-like syndrome
- Werner syndrome

== Treatment ==
In November 2020, the U.S. Food and Drug Administration approved lonafarnib, which helps prevent buildup of defective progerin and similar proteins. A clinical trial in 2018 points to significantly lower mortality rates – treatment with lonafarnib alone compared with no treatment (3.7% vs. 33.3%) – at a median post-trial follow-up time span of 2.2 years. The drug, given orphan drug status and Pediatric Disease Priority Review Voucher, is taken twice daily in the form of capsules and may cost US$650,000 per year, making it prohibitive for the vast majority of families. It is unclear how it will be covered by health insurance in the United States. Common side effects of the drug include "nausea, vomiting, diarrhea, infections, decreased appetite, and fatigue".

Other treatment options have focused on reducing complications (such as cardiovascular disease) with coronary artery bypass surgery and low-dose acetylsalicylic acid. Growth hormone treatment has been attempted. The use of Morpholinos has also been attempted in mice and cell cultures in order to reduce progerin production. Antisense Morpholino oligonucleotides specifically directed against the mutated exon 11–exon 12 junction in the mutated pre-mRNAs were used.

A type of anticancer drug, the farnesyltransferase inhibitors (FTIs), has been proposed, but their use has been mostly limited to animal models. A Phase II clinical trial using the FTI lonafarnib began in May 2007. In studies on the cells another anti-cancer drug, rapamycin, caused removal of progerin from the nuclear membrane through autophagy. It has been proved that pravastatin and zoledronate are effective drugs when it comes to the blocking of farnesyl group production.

Farnesyltransferase inhibitors (FTIs) are drugs that inhibit the activity of an enzyme needed to make a link between progerin proteins and farnesyl groups. This link generates the permanent attachment of the progerin to the nuclear rim. In progeria, cellular damage can occur because that attachment occurs, and the nucleus is not in a normal state. Lonafarnib is an FTI, which means it can avoid this link, so progerin can not remain attached to the nucleus rim, and it now has a more normal state.

Studies of sirolimus, an mTOR Inhibitor, demonstrate that it can minimize the phenotypic effects of progeria fibroblasts. Other observed consequences of its use are abolishing nuclear blebbing, degradation of progerin in affected cells, and reducing insoluble progerin aggregates formation. These results have been observed only in vitro and are not the results of any clinical trial, although it is believed that the treatment might benefit HGPS patients.

Recently, it has been demonstrated that the CRM1 protein (a key component of the nuclear export machinery in mammalian) is upregulated in HGPS cells, which drives to the abnormal localization of NES containing proteins from the nucleus to the cytoplasm. Moreover, the inhibition of CRM1 in HGPS alleviates the associated-senescence phenotype as well as the mitochondrial function (an important determinant in senescence) and lysosome content. These results are under in vivo validation with selinexor (a more suitable CRM1 inhibitor for human use).

== Prognosis ==
As there is no known cure, the average life expectancy of people with progeria is 13 years, as of 2003. At least 90 percent of patients die from complications of atherosclerosis, such as heart attack or stroke.

Mental development is not adversely affected; in fact, intelligence tends to be average to above average. With respect to the features of aging that progeria appears to manifest, the development of symptoms is comparable to aging at a rate eight to ten times faster than normal. With respect to those that progeria does not exhibit, patients show no neurodegeneration or cancer predisposition. They also do not develop conditions that are commonly associated with accumulation of damage, such as cataracts (caused by UV exposure) and osteoarthritis.

Although there may not be any successful treatments for progeria itself, there are treatments for the problems it causes, such as arthritic, respiratory, and cardiovascular problems, and recent medicinal breakthroughs enabled one patient to live until age 28. People with progeria have normal reproductive development, and there are known cases of women with progeria who delivered healthy offspring.

== Epidemiology ==
A study from the Netherlands has shown an incidence of 1 in 20 million births. According to the Progeria Research Foundation, as of September 2020, there are 179 known cases in the world, in 53 countries; 18 of the cases were identified in the United States. Hundreds of cases have been reported in medical history since 1886. However, the Progeria Research Foundation believes there may be as many as 150 undiagnosed cases worldwide.

There have been only two cases in which a healthy person was known to carry the LMNA mutation that causes progeria. One family from India had four of six children with progeria.

== Research ==
=== Mouse model ===
A mouse model of progeria exists, though in the mouse, the LMNA prelamin A is not mutated. Instead, ZMPSTE24, the specific protease that is required to remove the C-terminus of prelamin A, is missing. Both cases result in the buildup of farnesylated prelamin A on the nuclear membrane and in the characteristic nuclear LMNA blebbing.

In 2020, BASE editing was used in a mouse model to target the LMNA gene mutation that causes the progerin protein instead of the healthy Lamin A while in 2023 a study designed a peptide that prevented progerin from binding to BubR1 which is known to regulate aging in mice.

=== DNA repair ===
Repair of DNA double-strand breaks can occur by either of two processes, non-homologous end joining (NHEJ) or homologous recombination (HR). A-type lamins promote genetic stability by maintaining levels of proteins that have key roles in NHEJ and HR. Mouse cells deficient for maturation of prelamin A show increased DNA damage and chromosome aberrations and have increased sensitivity to DNA damaging agents. In progeria, the inability to adequately repair DNA damages due to defective A-type lamin may cause aspects of premature aging (also see DNA damage theory of aging).

=== Epigenetic clock analysis of human HGPS ===
Fibroblast samples from children with progeria syndrome exhibit accelerated epigenetic aging effects according to the epigenetic clock for skin and blood samples.

== History ==
Progeria was first described in 1886 by Jonathan Hutchinson. It was also described independently in 1897 by Hastings Gilford. The condition was later named Hutchinson–Gilford progeria syndrome. Scientists are interested in progeria partly because it might reveal clues about the normal process of aging.

=== Etymology ===
The word progeria comes from the Greek words pro (πρό) 'before, premature', and gēras (γῆρας), 'old age'.

== Society and culture ==
=== Notable cases ===
In 1987, fifteen-year-old Mickey Hays, who had progeria, appeared along with Jack Elam in the documentary I Am Not a Freak. Elam and Hays first met during the filming of the 1986 film The Aurora Encounter, in which Hays was cast as an alien. The friendship that developed lasted until Hays died in 1992, on his 20th birthday.

Harold Kushner, who among other things wrote the book When Bad Things Happen to Good People, had a son, Aaron, who died at the age of 14 in 1977 of progeria.

Margaret Casey, a 29-year-old woman with progeria who was then believed to be the oldest survivor of the premature aging disease, died on Sunday, May 26, 1985. Casey, a freelance artist, was admitted to Yale New Haven Hospital on the night of May 25 with respiratory problems, which caused her death.

Sam Berns was an American activist with the disease. He was the subject of the HBO documentary Life According to Sam. Berns also gave a TEDx talk titled "My Philosophy for a Happy Life" on December 13, 2013.

Hayley Okines was an English progeria patient who spread awareness of the condition.

Leon Botha, the South African painter and DJ who was known, among other things, for his work with the hip-hop duo Die Antwoord, lived with progeria. He died in 2011, aged 26.

Alexandra Peraut is a Catalan girl with progeria; she has inspired the book Una nena entre vint milions ('A girl in 20 million'), a children's book explaining progeria.

Adalia Rose Williams, born December 10, 2006, was an American girl with progeria, who was a notable YouTuber and vlogger who shared her everyday life on social media. She died on January 12, 2022, at the age of 15.

Amy Foose, born September 12, 1969, was an American girl with progeria, who died at the age of 16 on December 19, 1985. She was the sister of American automobile designer, artist, and TV star Chip Foose, who started a foundation in her name called Amy's Depot. The Progeria Research Foundation gives out The Amy Award every few years, in honor of Amy.

Sammy Basso, born December 1, 1995, was an Italian biologist, activist and writer who studied progeria and campaigned to raise awareness of the disease; he died at the age of 28 on October 5, 2024. At the time of his death he was the longest-living survivor of the condition.

Tiffany Wedekind, an internet influencer from Columbus, Ohio known as Tenacious Tiffany, is currently the oldest living person with progeria at 49. She also designs clothes, does yoga, involved in public speaking, amongst other things. She credits her positive attitude towards her longevity with the disease. She was also featured on TLC's show One Day In My Body.

=== Fiction ===
Orlando Gardiner, one of the main characters in Tad Williams' science fiction tetralogy Otherland, suffers from progeria. Due to his illness, he spends a lot of time gaming on the net as Thargor, the barbarian. Over the course of the story, he dies at 14 years of age.

The protagonist of the 2009 Hindi feature film Paa is a boy with a rare genetic condition progeria and the film focuses on his relationship with his parents.

The episode "Scientific Method" of the television series Star Trek: Voyager features an adult character who experiences advanced aging after his genes are altered, leading the ship's doctor to draw a comparison with progeria.

Kimberly Akimbo, both the 2021 Broadway Musical (Tony Award for Best Musical) and the 2001 play, tell the story of a 16-year-old girl with a progeria-like disease. Both the play and musical, book and lyrics, are by David Lindsay-Abaire, with Jeanine Tesori writing the music.

== See also ==
- NUBPL
