= Lonafarnib =

Medication investigated as a treatment for progeria

Clinical data
- Trade names: Zokinvy
- Other names: SCH 66336
- License data: US DailyMed: Lonafarnib
- Routes of administration: By mouth
- ATC code: A16AX20 (WHO)

Legal status
- Legal status: US: ℞-only; EU: Rx-only

Identifiers
- IUPAC name: 4-(2-{4-[(11R)-3,10-dibromo-8-chloro-6,11-dihydro-5H-benzo[5,6]cyclohepta[1,2-b]pyridin-11-yl]piperidin-1-yl}-2-oxoethyl)piperidine-1-carboxamide
- CAS Number: 193275-84-2
- PubChem CID: 148195
- IUPHAR/BPS: 8024
- DrugBank: DB06448
- ChemSpider: 130645
- UNII: IOW153004F
- KEGG: D04768
- ChEBI: CHEBI:47097
- ChEMBL: ChEMBL298734
- PDB ligand: 336 (PDBe, RCSB PDB)
- CompTox Dashboard (EPA): DTXSID90172927
- ECHA InfoCard: 100.204.509

Chemical and physical data
- Formula: C_{27}H_{31}Br_{2}ClN_{4}O_{2}
- Molar mass: 638.83 g·mol^{−1}
- 3D model (JSmol): Interactive image
- SMILES: C=12CCC=3C=C(C=C(C3[C@H](C1N=CC(=C2)Br)C4CCN(CC4)C(=O)CC5CCN(CC5)C(N)=O)Br)Cl
- InChI: InChI=1S/C27H31Br2ClN4O2/c28-20-12-19-2-1-18-13-21(30)14-22(29)24(18)25(26(19)32-15-20)17-5-9-33(10-6-17)23(35)11-16-3-7-34(8-4-16)27(31)36/h12-17,25H,1-11H2,(H2,31,36)/t25-/m1/s1; Key:DHMTURDWPRKSOA-RUZDIDTESA-N

Lonafarnib, sold under the brand name Zokinvy, is a medication used to reduce the risk of death due to Hutchinson-Gilford progeria syndrome and for the treatment of certain processing-deficient progeroid laminopathies in people one year of age and older. It is under trial for its use as combination treatment for Hepatitis D Virus.

The most common side effects included nausea, vomiting, headache, diarrhea, infection, decreased appetite and fatigue.

Lonafarnib was approved for medical use in the United States in November 2020, and in the European Union in July 2022. The U.S. Food and Drug Administration (FDA) considers it to be a first-in-class medication.

== Medical uses ==
Lonafarnib is indicated to be used to reduce the risk of death due to Hutchinson-Gilford progeria syndrome and for the treatment of certain other processing-deficient progeroid laminopathies in people one year of age and older.

== Contraindications ==
Lonafarnib is contraindicated for co-administration with strong or moderate CYP3A inhibitors and inducers, as well as midazolam and certain cholesterol-lowering medications.

== History ==
Lonafarnib, a farnesyltransferase inhibitor, is an oral medication that helps prevent the buildup of defective progerin or progerin-like protein. Its effectiveness for the treatment of Hutchinson–Gilford progeria syndrome was supported by clinical data and comparisons with untreated patients from a natural history study. Lonafarnib's approval for the treatment of certain processing-deficient progeroid laminopathies was based on similarities in the underlying genetic mechanism of disease and other available data.

The U.S. Food and Drug Administration (FDA) granted the application for lonafarnib priority review, orphan drug, and breakthrough therapy designations. In addition, the manufacturer received a rare pediatric disease priority review voucher. The FDA granted the approval of Zokinvy to Eiger BioPharmaceuticals, Inc.

== Society and culture ==
=== Legal status ===
On 19 May 2022, the Committee for Medicinal Products for Human Use (CHMP) of the European Medicines Agency (EMA) adopted a positive opinion, recommending the granting of a marketing authorization under exceptional circumstances for the medicinal product Zokinvy, intended for the treatment of patients with progeroid syndromes. The applicant for this medicinal product is EigerBio Europe Limited. It was approved for medical use in the European Union in July 2022.

== Research ==
Lonafarnib is a farnesyltransferase inhibitor (FTI) that has been investigated in a human clinical trial as a treatment for progeria, which is an extremely rare genetic disorder in which symptoms resembling aspects of aging are manifested at a very early age. For those with progeria, research has shown that the drug reduces the prevalence of stroke and transient ischemic attack, and the prevalence and frequency of headaches while taking the medication. A phase II clinical trial was completed in 2012, which showed that a cocktail of drugs that included lonafarnib and two other drugs met clinical efficacy endpoints that improved the height and diminished the rigidity of the bones of progeria patients.

Lonafarnib is a synthetic tricyclic halogenated carboxamide with antineoplastic properties. As such, it is used primarily for cancer treatment.

=== Hepatitis D ===
Ongoing studies and clinical trials have found a correlation of lonafarnib treatment with cure of hepatitis D (HDV). Up to now, the trials have proven an efficacy of lonafarnib on HDV if combined with ritonavir, as a supportive treatment for pegylated interferon alpha therapy.

=== Cancer ===
Lonafarnib (also known as SCH 66336) is an orally bioavailable, non-peptidomimetic inhibitor of farnesyltransferase (FTase), an enzyme responsible for the post-translational farnesylation of proteins such as Ras, RhoB, and centromere-binding proteins. This modification is essential for the membrane localization and activation of these proteins, many of which are implicated in oncogenesis. Originally developed by Merck & Co. in the late 1990s as an anticancer agent targeting Ras-driven malignancies, lonafarnib aimed to block oncogenic signaling pathways. However, despite promising preclinical data, its clinical development for cancer was largely discontinued due to insufficient efficacy as monotherapy in advanced solid tumors and hematologic malignancies. It is now FDA-approved (as Zokinvy™) for Hutchinson-Gilford progeria syndrome (HGPS) and certain progeroid laminopathies, with ongoing investigations in hepatitis D virus (HDV) infection. Below is an overview of its use in cancer patients based on historical and recent data.

==== Mechanism of Action in Cancer ====
Lonafarnib inhibits FTase, preventing the farnesylation of Ras proteins, which are mutated in approximately 30% of human cancers (e.g., pancreatic, colorectal, lung). This disrupts Ras-mediated signaling pathways involved in cell proliferation, survival, and metastasis. Emerging evidence suggests broader effects, including modulation of RhoB (a tumor suppressor), inhibition of autophagy flux (e.g., via ATG3-mediated cyclin D1 degradation), and reduction of tau inclusions in tauopathy models, which may have implications for certain cancers. Preclinical studies demonstrated anti-proliferative effects on Ras-independent tumor cell lines (e.g., lung, pancreas, colon, prostate, bladder, and hematologic cancers). Notably, lonafarnib has shown synergistic potential with chemotherapeutics by enhancing sensitivity to agents like sorafenib, paclitaxel, and docetaxel, potentially overcoming drug resistance through increased lysosomal activation and efflux pump inhibition.

==== Clinical Trials and Efficacy ====
Lonafarnib entered clinical development for cancer in the early 2000s, with extensive phase 1-3 trials evaluating it as monotherapy or in combinations. Early phase 2 studies showed modest activity, but larger randomized trials failed to meet efficacy endpoints, leading to halted oncology programs by the mid-2010s. Key findings include:

===== Monotherapy =====
In advanced breast cancer (phase 2, n=76 women post-chemotherapy/endocrine therapy), continuous or intermittent oral dosing (200 mg BID) yielded objective response rates of 10-14%, but no progression to phase 3 due to limited durability. Refractory head and neck cancer (phase 2, n=15): Minimal responses (<10% partial responses). Advanced pancreatic, colorectal, and non-small cell lung cancer (phase 2): Response rates <10%, with no robust survival benefit. Hematologic malignancies (e.g., acute myeloid leukemia [AML], chronic myelogenous leukemia [CML]): Promising early signals in AML/CML, but phase 3 trials (e.g., with tipifarnib, a related FTI) did not confirm superiority over standard care.

===== Combination Therapy =====
Non-small cell lung cancer (NSCLC): Phase 2 data with paclitaxel showed encouraging response rates in taxane-pretreated patients, but a phase 3 trial (paclitaxel + carboplatin ± lonafarnib) was terminated for futility. Hepatocellular carcinoma (HCC): In vitro/in vivo models showed lonafarnib synergizes with sorafenib, inducing autophagic flux and cyclin D1 degradation, reducing HCC cell growth by >50% at low doses (e.g., 5-10 μM). A phase 2 trial suggested potential to lower sorafenib doses and mitigate resistance, extending survival by 3-5 months in responsive subsets (~30% of patients), though clinical trials are limited and preclinical. Prostate cancer: Intermittent dosing with docetaxel potentiated efficacy in models, but human data were inconclusive. Urothelial cancer: Phase 2 with gemcitabine showed feasibility but no significant improvement in salvage settings. Overall, while preclinical synergy is evident, clinical efficacy has been "weak" or "not robust" in solid tumors, with development discontinued for myelodysplastic syndromes, leukemia, and most solid tumors due to lack of survival benefit. No cancer indications are currently approved, and ongoing trials are rare (e.g., NCT00773474 for metastatic breast cancer, completed but unpublished results).

===== Side Effects and Safety Profile =====
Lonafarnib is generally well-tolerated at oncology doses (100-200 mg BID orally), but dose-dependent toxicities limit its use. Common adverse events (≥20% incidence) include:

Adverse Event	Frequency	Notes
Fatigue	40-60%	Dose-limiting; often grade 1-2
Diarrhea	30-50%	Manageable with antidiarrheals
Nausea/Anorexia	20-40%	Dose-dependent; supportive care effective
Myelosuppression (neutropenia, thrombocytopenia)	10-30%	More common in combinations
QTc Prolongation	<5%	Rare (1/15 in head/neck trial); monitor ECG
Elevated ALT/AST	20-35%	Transient, mild (≤3x ULN in 5%); no Hy's law cases in cancer trials

Serious risks include nephrotoxicity, retinal toxicity, and embryo-fetal harm (contraindicated in pregnancy). Drug interactions are significant: Strong CYP3A4 inhibitors (e.g., ketoconazole) increase exposure (AUC up 4-5x), while inducers (e.g., rifampin) decrease it. In cancer trials, discontinuations due to toxicity were ~10-15%. LiverTox data confirm no clinically apparent acute liver injury, though monitoring is advised.

Current Status and Future Directions

As of 2025, lonafarnib is not approved or routinely used for cancer treatment. Its oncology legacy informs research into FTase inhibitors for Ras-mutant cancers (e.g., KRAS G12C), but successors like tipifarnib have also faltered. Interest persists in combinations for HCC and drug-resistant tumors, with preclinical data supporting trials. Patients should consult oncologists for alternatives like targeted therapies (e.g., sotorasib for KRAS-mutated NSCLC). For progeria or HDV, it remains a standard option.
