= Progeria Research Foundation =

American nonprofit organization

The Progeria Research Foundation (PRF) is a non-profit organization dedicated to developing treatments and, ultimately, a cure for progeria, a congenital disorder. The Foundation was established in 1999 by the family and friends of Sam Berns, a child with progeria, including Dr. Leslie Gordon and Dr. Scott Berns, his parents, and Audrey Gordon, his aunt.

From their website, the Foundation's mission statement is: "To discover treatments and the cure for Progeria and its aging related disorders."

In 2003, The Progeria Research Foundation helped to discover the gene mutation that causes progeria and developed a diagnostic test for it. In 2020 the American Food and Drug Administration approved the use of lonafarnib in children with the disease based on research and funding provided by the Foundation. It is the first and only certified medical protocol for the disease.

One of PRF's major campaigns is Find the Other 150, the goal of which is to identify and diagnose as many progeria patients as possible globally.
