= Autoimmune regulator =

Immune system protein

AIRE
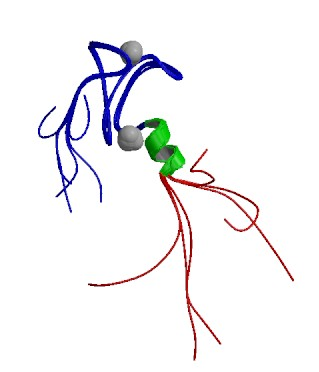

Identifiers
- Aliases: AIRE, AIRE1, APECED, APS1, APSI, PGA1, autoimmune regulator
- External IDs: OMIM: 607358; MGI: 1338803; GeneCards: AIRE
Available structures
PDB	Ortholog search: PDBe RCSB
PDB	List of PDB id codes 2LRI, 1XWH, 2KE1, 2KFT

Gene location (Human)
Chr.	Chromosome 21 (human)
Band	21q22.3	Start	44,285,838 bp
Band	21q22.3	End	44,298,648 bp

Gene location (Mouse)
Chr.	Chromosome 10 (mouse)
Band	10 C1|10 39.72 cM	Start	77,865,856 bp
Band	10 C1|10 39.72 cM	End	77,879,444 bp
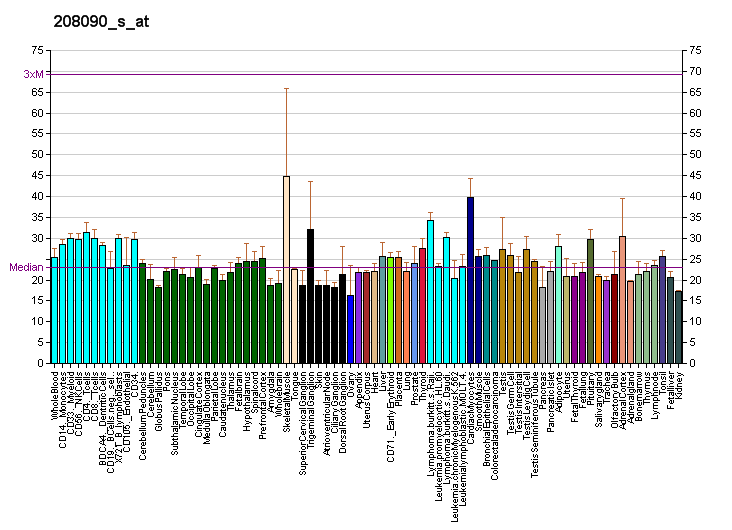
RNA expression pattern
Bgee	Human / Mouse (ortholog); Top expressed in: testicle; hypothalamus; cingulate gyrus; anterior cingulate cortex; lymph node; granulocyte; nucleus accumbens; right frontal lobe; substantia nigra; dorsolateral prefrontal cortex / Top expressed in: primary oocyte; urethra; embryo; thymus; secondary oocyte; parasympathetic nervous system; pharynx; embryo; saccule; cumulus cell; More reference expression data
BioGPS	More reference expression data
Gene ontology
Molecular function	DNA binding; RNA polymerase II transcription regulatory region sequence-specific DNA binding; DNA-binding transcription activator activity, RNA polymerase II-specific; histone binding; chromatin binding; transcription coregulator activity; translation regulator activity; metal ion binding; protein binding; identical protein binding; zinc ion binding; DNA-binding transcription factor activity, RNA polymerase II-specific
Cellular component	cytoplasm; intracellular anatomical structure; nuclear body; nucleus
Biological process	regulation of transcription, DNA-templated; transcription, DNA-templated; negative thymic T cell selection; humoral immune response; immune response; regulation of translation; positive regulation of transcription by RNA polymerase II; transcription by RNA polymerase II; peripheral T cell tolerance induction; central tolerance induction to self antigen; chemokine production; positive regulation of transcription, DNA-templated; thymus epithelium morphogenesis; regulation of thymocyte migration
Sources:Amigo / QuickGO
Orthologs
Databases	NCBI: entry; OMA: entry
Species	Human	Mouse
Entrez	326	11634
Ensembl	ENSG00000160224	ENSMUSG00000000731
UniProt	O43918	Q9Z0E3
RefSeq (mRNA)	NM_000383; NM_000658; NM_000659	NM_001271549; NM_001271550; NM_001271551; NM_001271552; NM_001271553 NM_001271554; NM_001271555; NM_001271556; NM_001271557; NM_001271558; NM_001271559; NM_009646
RefSeq (protein)	NP_000374	NP_001258478; NP_001258479; NP_001258480; NP_001258481; NP_001258482 NP_001258483; NP_001258484; NP_001258485; NP_001258486; NP_001258487; NP_001258488; NP_033776
Location (UCSC)	Chr 21: 44.29 – 44.3 Mb	Chr 10: 77.87 – 77.88 Mb
PubMed search
- Wikidata
View/Edit Human	View/Edit Mouse

The autoimmune regulator (AIRE) is a protein that in humans is encoded by the AIRE gene. It is a 13 kbp gene on chromosome 21q22.3 that encodes 545 amino acids. AIRE is a transcription factor expressed in the medulla (inner part) of the thymus. It is part of the mechanism which eliminates self-reactive T cells that would cause autoimmune disease. It exposes T cells to normal, healthy proteins from all parts of the body, and T cells that react to those proteins are destroyed.

Each T cell recognizes a specific antigen when it is presented in complex with a major histocompatibility complex (MHC) molecule by an antigen presenting cell. This recognition is accomplished by the T cell receptors expressed on the cell surface. T cells receptors are generated by randomly shuffled gene segments which results in a highly diverse population of T cells—each with a unique antigen specificity. Subsequently, T cells with receptors that recognize the body's own proteins need to be eliminated while still in the thymus. Through the action of AIRE, medullary thymic epithelial cells (mTEC) express major proteins from elsewhere in the body (tissue-restricted antigens, TRA) and T cells that respond to those proteins are eliminated through cell death (apoptosis). Thus AIRE drives negative selection of self-recognizing T cells. When AIRE is defective, T cells that recognize antigens normally produced by the body can exit the thymus and enter circulation. This can result in a variety of autoimmune diseases.

The gene was first reported by two independent research groups Aaltonen et al. and Nagamine et al. in 1997 who were able to isolate and clone the gene from human chromosome 21q22.3. Their work was able to show that mutations in the AIRE gene are responsible for the pathogenesis of autoimmune polyglandular syndrome type I. More insight into the AIRE protein was later provided by Heino et al. in 2000. They showed that AIRE protein is mainly expressed in the thymic medullary epithelial cells using immunohistochemistry.

== Function ==
In the thymus, the autoimmune regulator (AIRE) induces the transcription of a broad array of organ-specific genes, resulting in the production of proteins that are normally restricted to peripheral tissues. This ectopic expression creates an "immunological self-shadow" that exposes developing T cells to peripheral antigens, thereby facilitating the negative selection of self-reactive T cells and promoting central tolerance. This discovery was achieved through the combined efforts of researchers in Diane Mathis' lab— including Mark Anderson (immunologist)—and those in the Christopher Goodnow lab, where Adrian Liston led this work.

Studies have shown that AIRE is also expressed in a subset of stromal cells in secondary lymphoid tissues, though these cells express a distinct set of tissue‐restricted antigens compared to medullary thymic epithelial cells. It is important that self-reactive T cells that bind strongly to self-antigen are eliminated in the thymus (via the process of negative selection), otherwise they may later encounter and bind to their corresponding self-antigens and initiate an autoimmune reaction. So the expression of non-local proteins by AIRE in the thymus reduces the threat of autoimmunity by promoting the elimination of auto-reactive T cells that bind antigens not normally found in the thymus. Furthermore, it has been found that AIRE is expressed in a population of stromal cells located in secondary lymphoid tissues, however these cells appear to express a distinct set of TRAs compared to mTECs.

Research in knockout mice has demonstrated that AIRE functions through initiating the transcription of a complete spectrum of self-antigens in the thymus. This expression then allows maturing thymocytes to become tolerant towards peripheral organs, thereby avoiding autoimmune disease.

The AIRE gene is expressed in many other tissues as well. The AIRE gene is also expressed in the 33D1+ subset of dendritic cells in mouse and in human dendritic cells.

== Structure ==
AIRE is composed of a multidomain structure that is able to bind to chromatin and act as a regulator of gene transcription. The specific makeup of AIRE includes a caspase activation and recruitment domain (CARD), nuclear localization signal (NLS), SAND domain, and two plant-homeodomain (PHD) fingers. The SAND domain is located in the middle of the amino-acid chain (aa 180-280) and mediates the binding of AIRE to phosphate groups of DNA. Another potential role for this domain is to anchor AIRE to heterologous proteins. The two cysteine-rich PHD finger domains at the C-terminus of AIRE are PHD1 (aa 299-340) and PHD2 (aa 434-475) which are separated by a proline-rich region of amino acids. These finger domains serve to read chromatin marks through the degree of methylation at the tail of histone H3. More specifically, PHD1 is able to recognize unmethylation at the H3 tail as an epigenetic mark.

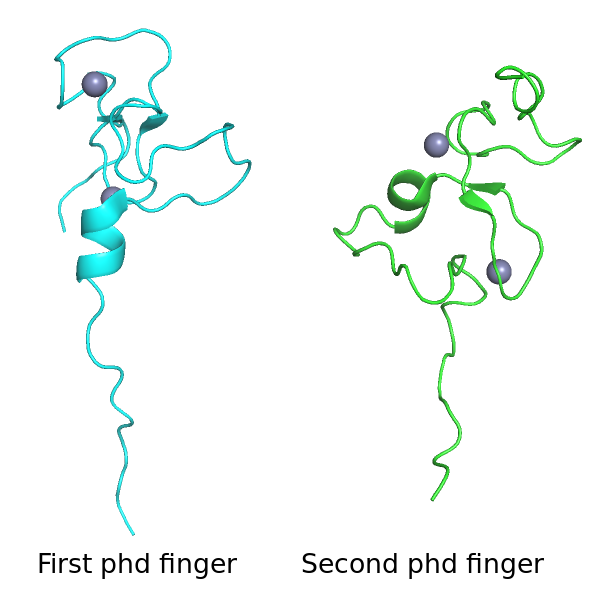
AIRE protein rendition with both PHD fingers shown

An integral characteristic of AIRE is its ability to homomerize into dimers and trimers which allows it to bind to specific oligonucleotide motifs. This property comes from the homogeneously staining region (HSR) located at the N-terminus. Because of the α-helical four-helix bundle structure, HSR’s are sensitive to conformational changes of the gene. Variants and deletions involving this domain cause an inability to activate gene transcription by preventing oligomer formation and can result in APS-1.

== Mechanism ==
Instead of binding to consensus sequences of target gene promoters, like conventional transcription factors, AIRE engages in coordinated sequences that are performed by its multimolecular complexes. The first AIRE partner that was identified is the CREB-binding protein (CBP) that is localized in nuclear bodies and is a co-activator of many transcription factors. Other AIRE partners include positive transcription elongation factor b (P-TEFb) and DNA activated protein kinase (DNA-PK). DNA-PK phosphorylates AIRE in vitro at Thr68 and Ser156. Another partner is DNA-topoisomerase (DNA-TOP) IIα. This isomerase enzyme works on DNA topology and removes positive and negative DNA supercoils by causing transient DNA breaks. In turn, this causes relaxation of local chromatin and helps the initiation and post-initiation events of gene transcription. By performing double-stranded DNA breaks, DNA-TOPIIα recruits DNA-PK and poly-(ADP-ribose) polymerase (PARP1) which are involved in DNA break and repair through non-homologous end joining.

== Pathology ==
The AIRE gene is mutated in the rare autoimmune syndrome autoimmune polyendocrinopathy syndrome type 1 (APS-1), also known as autoimmune polyendocrinopathy-candidiasis-ectodermal dystrophy (APECED). Different mutations are more common among certain populations in the world. The most common exonic mutations of AIRE occur on exons 1, 2, 6, 8, and 10. Exons 1 and 2 encode the HSR, exon 6 encodes the SAND domain, exon 8 is in the PHD-1 domain, and exon 10 is located in the proline-rich region between the two PHD finger domains. Known mutations in AIRE include Arg139X, Arg257X, and Leu323SerfsX51.

Disruption of AIRE results in the development of a range of autoimmune diseases, the most common clinical conditions in the syndrome are hypoparathyroidism, primary adrenocortical failure and chronic mucocutaneous candidiasis.

A gene knockout of the murine homolog of Aire has created a transgenic mouse model that is used to study the mechanism of disease in human patients.

== Interactions ==
Autoimmune regulator has been shown to interact with CREB binding protein.

== See also ==
- List of human clusters of differentiation for a list of CD molecules
- Immune system
- Immune tolerance
