= Nuclear bodies =

Structures found in the cell nuclei

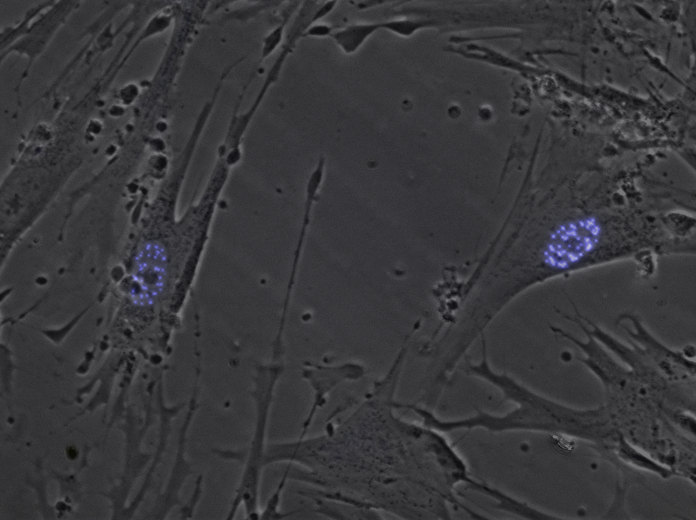
Nuclear bodies in human embryonic lung cells

Nuclear bodies (also known as nuclear domains or nuclear dots) are biomolecular condensates, membraneless structures found in the cell nuclei of eukaryotic cells. Nuclear bodies include Cajal bodies, the nucleolus, nuclear speckles (also called splicing speckles), paraspeckles, histone locus bodies, and promyelocytic leukemia protein (PML) nuclear bodies (also called PML oncogenic dots). Nuclear bodies also include ND10s. ND stands for nuclear domain, and 10 refers to the number of dots seen. Additionally, a nuclear body subtype is a clastosome suggested to be a site of protein degradation.

While biomolecular condensate is a term often used interchangeably with nuclear bodies, the term "condensates" implies the thermodynamic properties of the body are known. Thus, nuclear body (and sometimes nuclear compartment) is a term that is more general and encompasses structures where either the biophysical property is not a condensate or is currently untested.

Nuclear bodies were first seen as prominent interchromatin structures in the nuclei of malignant or hyperstimulated animal cells identified using anti-sp100 autoantibodies from primary biliary cirrhosis and subsequently the promyelocytic leukemia (PML) factor, but appear also to be elevated in many autoimmune and cancerous diseases. Nuclear dots are metabolically stable and resistant to nuclease digestion and salt extraction.

== Structure ==
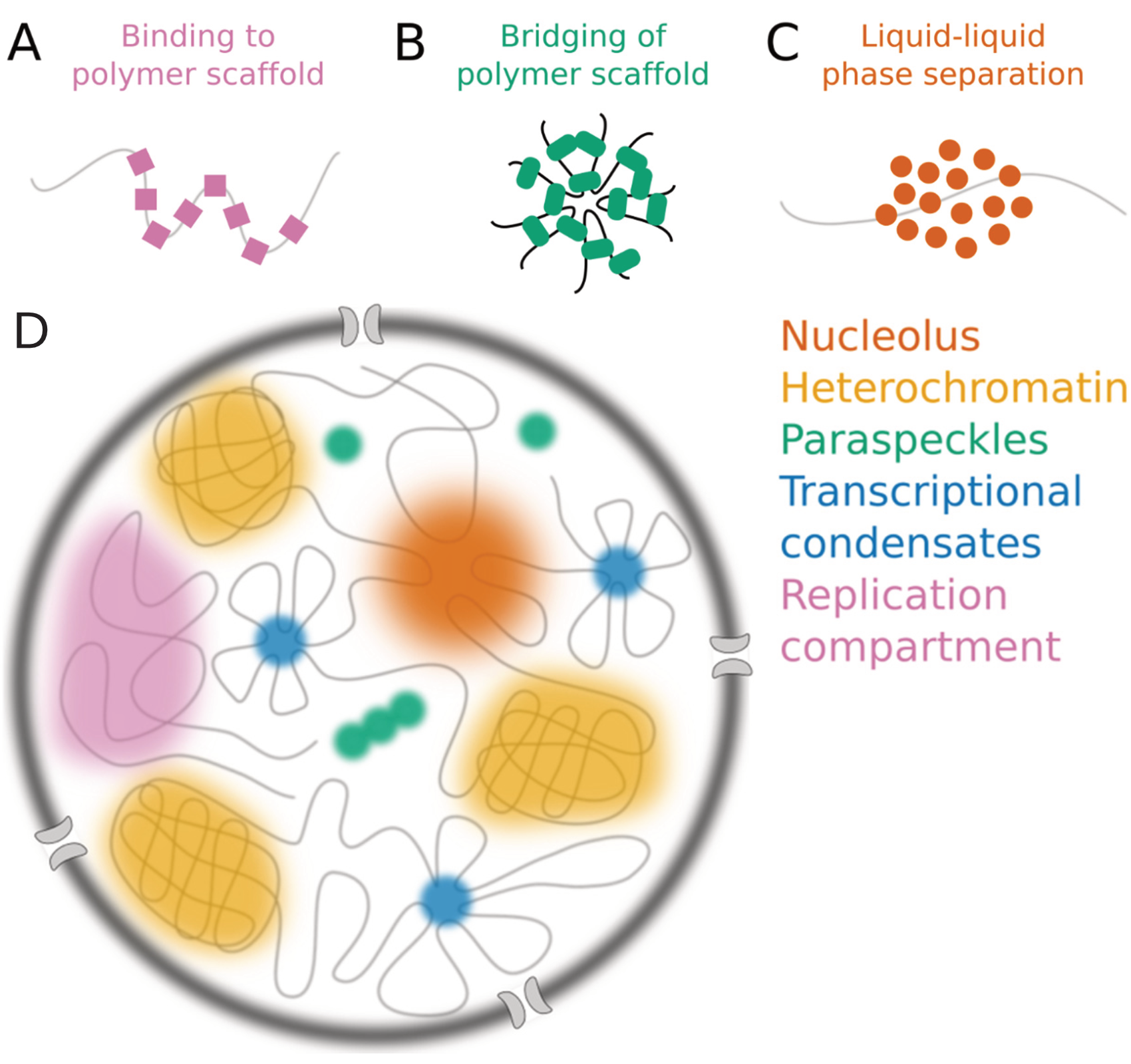
Diagram of the formation of nuclear bodies.

Simple nuclear bodies (types I and II) and the shells of complex nuclear bodies (types III, IVa and V) consist of a non-chromatinic fibrillar material which is most likely proteinaceous. That nuclear bodies co-isolated with the nuclear matrix, and were linked to the fibrogranular nuclear matrix component by projections from the surface of the nuclear bodies. The primary components of the nuclear dots are the proteins sp100 nuclear antigen, LYSP100(a homolog of sp100), ISG20, PML antigen, NDP55 and 53kDa protein associated with the nuclear matrix. Other proteins, such as PIC1/SUMO-1, which are associated with nuclear pore complex also associate with nuclear dots. The proteins can reorganize in the nucleus, by increasing number of dispersion in response to different stress (stimulation or heat shock, respectively).

== Function ==
One of the nuclear body proteins appears to be involved in transcriptional active regions. Expression of PML antigen and sp100 is responsive to interferons. Sp100 seems to have transcriptional transactivating properties. PML protein was reported to suppress growth and transformation, and specifically inhibits the infection of vesicular stomatitis virus (VSV) (a rhabdovirus) and influenza A virus, but not other types of viruses. The SUMO-1 ubiquitin like protein is responsible for modifying PML protein such that it is targeted to dots. whereas overexpression of PML results in programmed cell death.

One hypothesized function of the dots is as a 'nuclear dump' or 'storage depot'. The nuclear bodies may not all perform the same function. Sp140 associates with certain bodies and appears to be involved in transcriptional activation.

ND10 nuclear bodies have been shown to play a major role in chromatin regulation.

Nuclear bodies have been suggested to be involved in multiple aspects of gene regulation. By concentrating substrates and enzymes in these defined territories (i.e., pre-ribosomal RNA and associated ribosome biogenesis protein within the nucleolus), it is hypothesized that this may help increase the efficiency of the enzymatic reactions associated with the particular nuclear body. For example, nuclear speckles, once thought to be storage depots of splicing factors, have been now shown to concentrate splicing-promoting factors (e.g., components of the major and minor spliceosome) and pre-mRNA substrate molecules to boost the kinetic efficiency of the splicing reaction. Thus future studies will show whether other nuclear bodies play functional roles in various aspects of gene regulation, such as transcription, RNA modifications, ribosome biogenesis, and other nuclear processes.

=== Pathology ===
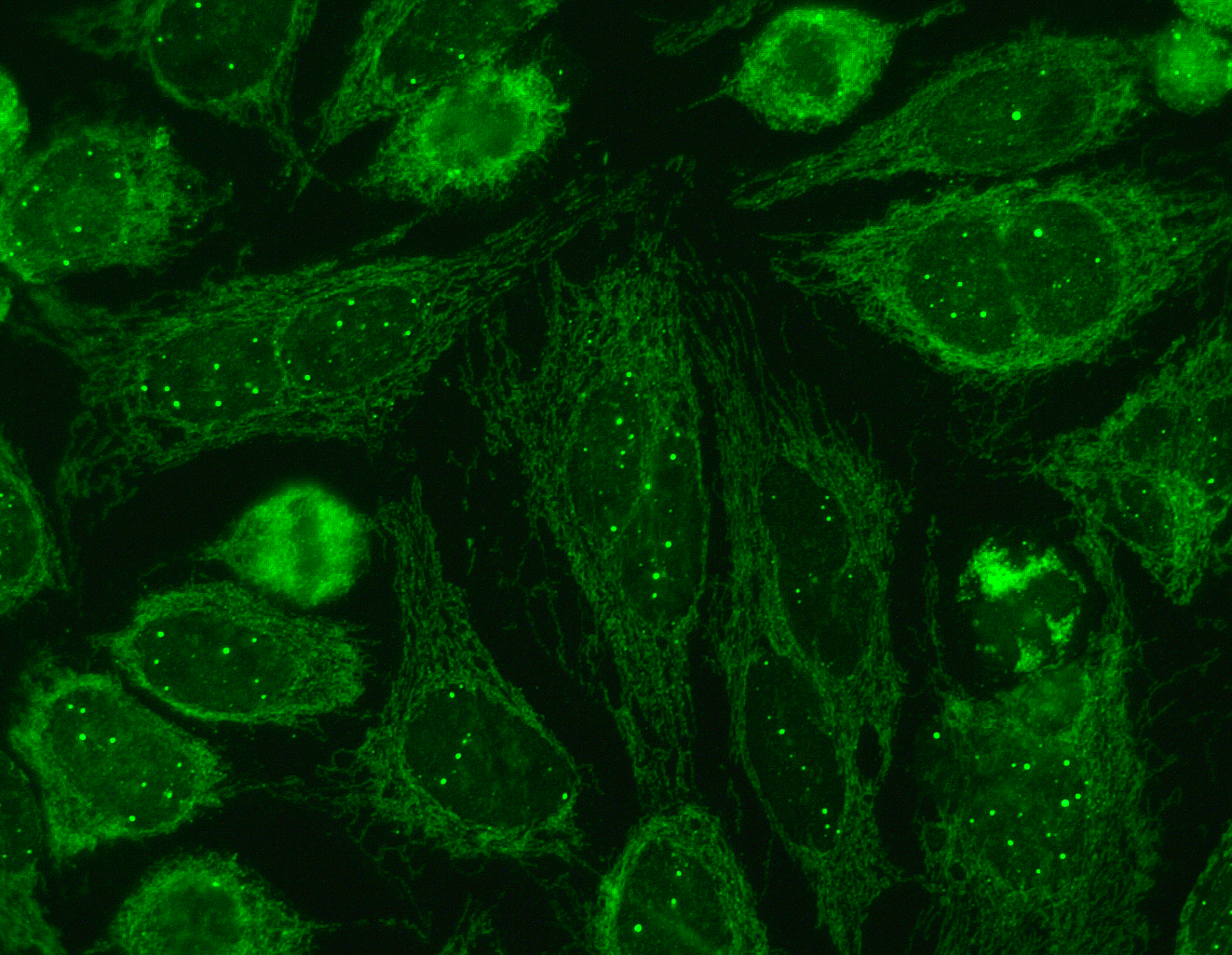
Immunofluorescence staining pattern of sp100 antibodies. Nuclear dots can be seen in the nucleus of the cells. Produced using serum from a patient with primary biliary cirrhosis on HEp-20-10 cells with a FITC conjugate.

These, or similar, bodies have been found increased in the presence of lymphoid cancers and SLE (lupus). They are also observed at higher frequencies in subacute sclerosing panencephalitis; in this instance, antibodies to measles show expression in and localization to the nuclear bodies.

- In promyelocytic leukemia (PML), the oncogenic PML-retinoic acid receptor alpha (RARalpha) chimera disrupts the normal concentration of PML in nuclear bodies. Administration of arsenic trioxide (As_{2}O_{3}) plus all-trans retinoic acid (Tretinoin) causes remission of this leukemia by triggering the bodies' reorganization. As_{2}O_{3} destroys the chimera, allowing new SUMO-1 ubiquitinated PML to relocalize to nuclear bodies. Retinoic acid induces a caspase-3 mediated degradation of the same chimera.
- In HHV, ICP0 disrupts nuclear dots in the early stage of infection.
