= Mark Anderson =

Mark Anderson may refer to:

== In sport ==
- Mark Anderson (American football) (born 1983), American football player
- Mark Anderson (decathlete) (born 1958), American decathlete and competitor at the 1983 World Championships
- Mark Anderson (runner), American distance runner and medallist at the 1980 IAAF World Cross Country Championships
- Mark Anderson (footballer, born 1989), English soccer player for Spennymoor Town FC
- Mark Anderson (golfer) (born 1986), American professional golfer
- Mark Anderson (South African soccer) (born 1962), South African soccer player
- Mark Anderson (sprinter) (born 1991), Belizean sprinter
- Mark Anderson (swimmer) (born 1952), Australian swimmer

== In other fields ==
- Mark Anderson (Arizona politician) (born 1954), Arizona politician
- Mark Anderson (Minnesota politician) (born 1958), Minnesota politician
- Mark Anderson (Connecticut politician), member of the Connecticut House of Representatives
- Mark Anderson (Royal Navy officer), British admiral
- Mark Edgar John Anderson, British admiral
- Mark Anderson (immunologist), American immunologist and medical researcher
- Mark Anderson (pianist), American pianist and prize winner in the 1993 Leeds International Piano Competition
- Mark Anderson (writer) (born 1967), American journalist and proponent of the Oxfordian theory of Shakespeare

== See also ==
- Mark Andersen, punk rock activist and author who lives in Washington D.C.
- Marc Anderson (disambiguation)
