= Sp100 nuclear antigen =

SP100
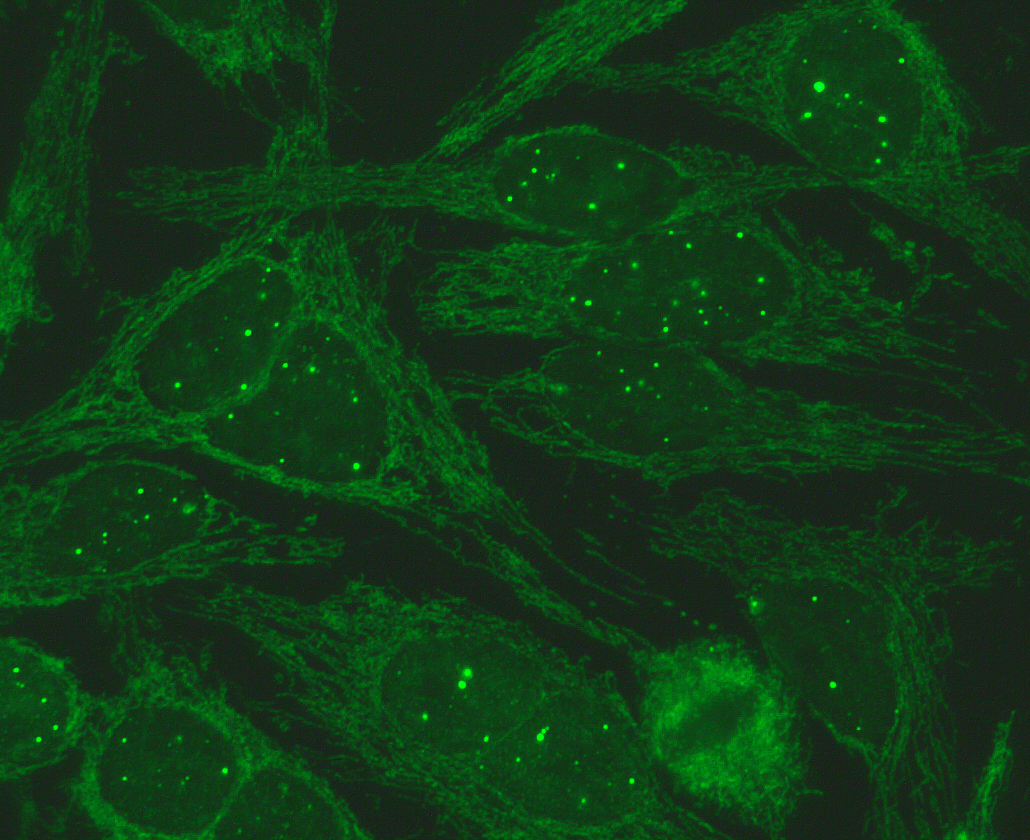

Identifiers
- Aliases: SP100, lysp100b, SP100 nuclear antigen
- External IDs: OMIM: 604585; MGI: 109561; GeneCards: SP100
Available structures
PDB	Ortholog search: PDBe RCSB
PDB	List of PDB id codes 1H5P, 5FB0, 5FB1

Gene location (Human)
Chr.	Chromosome 2 (human)
Band	2q37.1	Start	230,415,942 bp
Band	2q37.1	End	230,545,606 bp

Gene location (Mouse)
Chr.	Chromosome 1 (mouse)
Band	1 C5|1 43.6 cM	Start	85,577,709 bp
Band	1 C5|1 43.6 cM	End	85,637,719 bp
RNA expression pattern
Bgee	Human / Mouse (ortholog); Top expressed in: Achilles tendon; lymph node; right lung; spleen; tendon of biceps brachii; gallbladder; monocyte; bone marrow cell; sural nerve; upper lobe of left lung / Top expressed in: granulocyte; thymus; lymph node; spleen; mesenteric lymph nodes; blood; parotid gland; bone marrow; muscle of thigh; stroma of bone marrow; More reference expression data
BioGPS	n/a
Gene ontology
Molecular function	transcription corepressor activity; protein domain specific binding; chromo shadow domain binding; identical protein binding; protein homodimerization activity; kinase binding; transcription coactivator activity; DNA binding; transcription factor binding; protein binding; DNA-binding transcription factor activity, RNA polymerase II-specific; protein dimerization activity
Cellular component	nucleolus; nucleoplasm; cytoplasm; nucleus; PML body; Mre11 complex; nuclear periphery; nuclear body
Biological process	negative regulation of DNA-binding transcription factor activity; response to cytokine; transcription, DNA-templated; negative regulation of endothelial cell migration; negative regulation of viral transcription; regulation of angiogenesis; positive regulation of DNA-binding transcription factor activity; DNA damage response, signal transduction by p53 class mediator resulting in transcription of p21 class mediator; negative regulation of DNA binding; negative regulation of protein export from nucleus; viral process; negative regulation of transcription by RNA polymerase II; positive regulation of transcription, DNA-templated; telomere maintenance; response to type I interferon; regulation of Fas signaling pathway; retinoic acid receptor signaling pathway; response to retinoic acid; regulation of transcription, DNA-templated; response to interferon-gamma; type I interferon signaling pathway; regulation of extrinsic apoptotic signaling pathway via death domain receptors; negative regulation of transcription, DNA-templated; interferon-gamma-mediated signaling pathway; negative regulation of nucleic acid-templated transcription; maintenance of protein location
Sources:Amigo / QuickGO
Orthologs
Databases	NCBI: entry; OMA: entry
Species	Human	Mouse
Entrez	6672	20684
Ensembl	ENSG00000067066	ENSMUSG00000026222
UniProt	P23497	O35892
RefSeq (mRNA)	NM_003113; NM_001080391; NM_001206701; NM_001206702; NM_001206703 NM_001206704	NM_013673; NM_001313712; NM_001313713; NM_001313714; NM_001372231 NM_001372232
RefSeq (protein)	NP_001073860; NP_001193630; NP_001193631; NP_001193632; NP_001193633 NP_003104	NP_001300641; NP_001300642; NP_001300643; NP_038701; NP_001359160 NP_001359161
Location (UCSC)	Chr 2: 230.42 – 230.55 Mb	Chr 1: 85.58 – 85.64 Mb
PubMed search
- Wikidata
View/Edit Human	View/Edit Mouse

Nuclear autoantigen Sp-100 is a protein that in humans is encoded by the SP100 gene. Sp-100 is an interferon stimulated antigen found in the cell nuclei of many human and other animal cells. Autoantibodies directed against Sp100 are often found in patients with primary biliary cirrhosis. Histologically Sp100 'dots' regions of the cell nucleus. Viral infection and mitogens affect the expression of the Sp100 autoantigen. Cells grown in the presence of interferons (α, β, and γ) revealed an increase both in size and number of the Sp100 protein-containing nuclear dots and increase the protein concentration. This raises "the question whether cytokine-mediated increase of Sp100 protein expression plays a role in induction of anti-Sp100 autoantibodies."

== Sp100 and nuclear dots ==
Two proteins, Sp100 and promyelocytic leukemia (PML) factor are localized to punctate domains in the nucleus (nuclear dots or nuclear bodies). These domains (few to 20) were found to form a donut-shaped structure when cells were starved of amino acids. In particular, deprivation of cystine results in most pronounced changes. Two other proteins, PIC1/SUMO-1, that also interact with nuclear pore complex factors also interact with these two proteins. In addition Sp100 interacts with a chromatin binding protein, HP1 alpha.

== Sp100 splicoforms ==
Some Sp100 variants contain a domain similar to two interferon-inducible nuclear phosphoproteins, suppressin and DEAF1. This defines a novel protein motif, the HNPP-box. Another class of variants has high mobility group 1 (HMG1) protein sequence as a domain. Both major classes of Sp100 splice variant proteins localize in part to nuclear dots/PML bodies and other nuclear domains.
