= Snurposome =

Snurposomes are a type of granular structure that are found in the nuclei of oocytes. They are found in animals including mammals, amphibians, and insects. Snurposomes’ role in the cell is to contain small nuclear ribonucleoproteins, otherwise known as snRNPs.

== History ==
Snurposomes are found in the oocytes of many kinds of animals, but amphibian oocytes are the most common test subjects for research because of their large size and ease of experimental manipulation. A study by Wu, et al. aimed to research the localization of snRNPs within the oocytes, which resulted in them discovering and coining the term snurposomes. They used oocytes from the newt species Notophthalmus viridescens and the frog species Xenopus laevis. After isolating the cells’ nuclei, the researchers added antibodies Y12 and K21. These would specifically bind to the cell’s snRNPs, and by utilizing immunofluorescence microscopy they were able to identify where the snRNPs are housed in the cells. They found snRNP binding on chromosomes, organelles known as spheres, and they also found them clustered in hundreds to thousands of small granules in the nucleoplasm. These granules were termed snurposomes, based on the pronunciation of snRNP (“snurp”). Three kinds of snurposomes (A, B, and C) were identified with different contents. They were differentiated based on the kinds of snRNA (small nuclear RNA) each contained. A snurposomes were deemed those containing only U1 snRNA and associated antibodies. B snurposomes were deemed those containing U1, U2, U4, U5, and U6 (which are the five major splicing snRNAs) in addition to some related proteins. A B snurposome is composed of thousands of particles which have diameters between 20 and 30 nanometers, and they may be forms of splicing speckles. The C snurposomes were found to be less clear as to their identified contents. C snurposomes were greatly varied in size and usually in association with at least one B snurposome. This study also went on to research heterogeneous nuclear ribonucleoproteins (hnRNPs). These structures are also associated with snRNPs in the post-transcriptional modification of pre-mRNA. It was proposed that perhaps since the B snurposomes contained so many different components that it may be involved in the packaging and processing of hnRNP/snRNP complexes for use in RNA splicing.

=== snRNPs ===
SnRNP function was only vaguely understood until there was a breakthrough while researchers worked to treat an autoimmune disorder called systemic lupus erythematosus, which presents with a myriad of symptoms. In cases of this disorder, patients produce antibodies that bind to normal nuclear material. When various antibodies from patients were used to immunoprecipitate their respective antigens from mouse cells, they precipitated five snRNAs (U1, U2, U4, U5, and U6) along with seven antigenic proteins (SmB/B’, SmD1–3, SmE, SmF and SmG). These snRNAs became known as the splicing snRNAs.

SnRNPs are made of a combination of snRNA and a set of proteins. The snRNP is named in accordance with the kind of snRNA involved, namely U1, U2, U3, U4, U5, U6. SnRNPs with these RNA types are utilized in spliceosomes for RNA splicing. Uniquely, the U7 snRNP is not involved in splicing- instead it processes the 3′ stem-loop of histone pre-mRNA.

SnRNP biogenesis begins with the transcription of snRNA. This is done by RNA polymerase II or RNA polymerase III, depending on which snRNA is being produced. Despite the different RNA polymerases used in this process, the regulatory sequences in the snRNAs are very similar. They consist of an snRNA promoter, the snRNA coding region, and a termination unit. There are two important sequence elements contained within the promoter region of pol II and pol III snRNA genes. The first, located at approximately position −55 of the transcription start site, is called the proximal sequence element (PSE). The second, termed the distal sequence element (DSE), is located at position −220. Both sequence elements serve as binding platforms for snRNA-specific transcription factors. Additionally, pol III snRNA genes contain an additional TATA-box interspersed between PSE and the site for transcription initiation. The presence of a TATA-box seems to specify snRNA genes for transcription by pol III, as PSE and DSE sequences are functionally interchangeable between pol II and pol III promoters.

=== Spliceosomes ===
As mentioned, SnRNPs are utilized in spliceosome complexes, which play a crucial role in mRNA splicing. These RNA-protein complexes catalyze the removal of introns from pre-mRNA. Introns are segments of pre-mRNA that, depending on the desired protein product, are unnecessary for translation. The potential removal of specific introns allows for multiple possible protein products from a single pre-mRNA source. With many possibilities for each of millions of genes in an individual, this allows for an infinitely different combination of gene expressions throughout an organism, and, increasingly, between different individuals and species. Spliceosomes are made of snRNPs, proteins, and pre-mRNA. They form in the nucleus of a cell to serve their purpose after the transcription of DNA into RNA. Given the fact that snurposomes house the snRNPs necessary for spliceosomes, snurposomes are also housed in the nucleus, allowing the snRNPS to be readily available.

The process of mRNA editing requires haste. In addition to the splicing done by spliceosomes, more modifications like adding a “cap” to the 5’ end of the RNA and a “tail” to the 3’ end must happen before the mRNA is able to leave the nucleus. Mistakes in transcription and translation can have quickly accumulative effects. This makes it necessary to have quick editing processes in place to prevent such mistakes. Such cells that would be undergoing rapid transcription and translation would be those that are rapidly dividing. One cell type that undergoes rapid division is oocytes. Hence, snurposomes can be found in the nuclei of any cell type, but are more prominent in cell types that undergo rapid division such as oocytes.
