= Interchromatin granule =

Cell biology
- Components of a typical animal cell: 1. Nucleolus; 2. Nucleus; 3. Ribosome (dots as part of 5); 4. Vesicle; 5. Rough endoplasmic reticulum 6. Golgi apparatus (or, Golgi body); 7. Cytoskeleton; 8. Smooth endoplasmic reticulum 9. Mitochondrion; 10. Vacuole; 11. Cytosol (fluid that contains organelles; with which, comprises cytoplasm); 12. Lysosome; 13. Centrosome; 14. Cell membrane

- Components of a typical nucleus: 1. Nuclear envelope; 1.a. Outer membrane 1.b. Inner membrane: 2. Nucleolus; 3. Nucleoplasm; 4. Chromatin; 4.a. Heterochromatin 4.b. Euchromatin: 5. Ribosome; 6. Nuclear pore

An interchromatin granule is a cluster in the nucleus of a mammal cell which is enriched in pre-mRNA splicing factors. Interchromatin granules are located in the interchromatin regions of mammal cell nuclei. (Note: Similar structures have been observed in the nuclei of insect embryos, plant cells and amphibian oocytes, but the functional and molecular relationships are not fully established) They usually appear as irregularly shaped structures that vary in size and number. They can be observed by immunofluorescence microscopy.

Interchromatin granules are structures undergoing constant change, and their components exchange continuously with the nucleoplasm, active transcription sites and other nuclear locations.

Research on dynamics of interchromatin granules has provided new insight into the functional organisation of the nucleus and gene expression.

Interchromatin granule clusters vary in size anywhere between one and several micrometers in diameter. They are composed of 20–25 nm granules that are connected in a beaded chain fashion appearance by thin fibrils.

Interchromatin granule clusters (IGCs) may represent small nuclear ribonucleoproteins (snRNPs) that have completed their maturation process and can be supplied to nearby areas containing perichromatin fibers where splicing is taking place. Other proteins, such as RNA polymerase II and certain transcription factors, as well as poly-adenylated RNA may also be present. The maturation of snRNPs takes place in part in Cajal bodies, and IGCs may donate splicing factors to the snRNP.

== See also ==
- Cell nucleus § Splicing speckles are subnuclear structures that are enriched in pre-messenger RNA splicing factors
