= Homogeneously staining region =

Homogeneously staining regions (HSRs) are chromosomal segments with various lengths and uniform staining intensity after G banding. This type of aberration is also known as Copy Number Gains or Amplification.

An HSR is one type of change in a chromosome's structure which is frequently observed in the nucleus of human cancer cells. In the region of a chromosome where an HSR occurs, a segment of the chromosome, which presumably contains a gene or genes that give selective advantage to the progression of the cancer, is amplified or duplicated many times. As a result of the duplication this chromosomal segment is greatly lengthened and expanded such that when it is stained with a fluorescent probe specific to the region (Fluorescent in situ hybridization), rather than causing a focal fluorescent signal as in a normal chromosome, the probe "paints" a broad fluorescent signal over the whole of the amplified region. It is because of the appearance of this broadly staining region that this chromosomal abnormality was named a homogeneously staining region. The homogenously staining region was first observed in chromosome 2 by June Biedler and Barbara Spengler in cells that had been made resistant to methotrexate. The HSR was found due to the amplification of the DHFR gene.
