= Marc Anderson (disambiguation) =

Marc Anderson (born 1955) is an American musician who has been performing since the 1970s

Marc Anderson may also refer to:

- Marc Anderson (politician), member of the Pennsylvania House of Representatives
- Marc A. Anderson (born 1945), American chemist
- Marc Andreessen (born 1971), American entrepreneur
- Marc Anderson, American Army ranger killed in 2002 at the Battle of Takur Ghar in Afghanistan
- Marc Anderson, editor for the 1962 film The Brain That Wouldn't Die

== See also ==
- Mark Anderson (disambiguation)
