= Computed Corpuscle Sectioning =

Computed Corpuscle Sectioning is a general method for determining the volume, profile area, and perimeter of a slab section of any computer-modeled three-dimensional object in any orientation and at any position. It was originally developed as a model of cell nuclei in a tissue section in conjunction with the Reference Curve Method for correcting ploidy measurements by image analysis in a tissue section, but it is useful for evaluating any algorithm that corrects ploidy measurements for the effect of sectioning. Computed Corpuscle Sectioning has obvious pertinence to stereology, but has not been exploited in that field. The patents on this method (U.S. Patent numbers 5,918,038, 6,035,258, and 6,603,869) are no longer in force.
