= HHEX =

Protein-coding gene in the species Homo sapiens

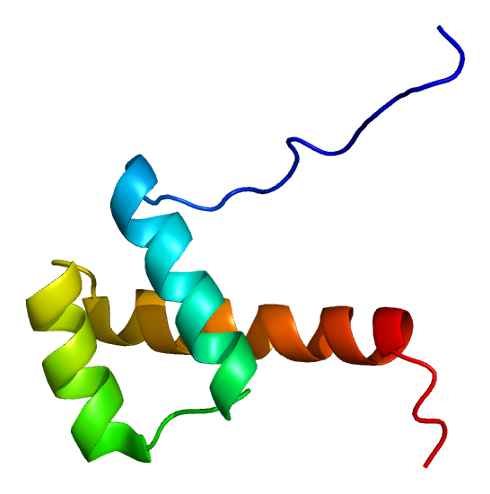

Identifiers
- Aliases: HHEX, HEX, HMPH, HOX11L-PEN, PRH, PRHX, hematopoietically expressed homeobox
- External IDs: OMIM: 604420; MGI: 96086; GeneCards: HHEX
Available structures
PDB	Ortholog search: PDBe RCSB
PDB	List of PDB id codes 2E1O

Gene location (Human)
Chr.	Chromosome 10 (human)
Band	10q23.33	Start	92,689,955 bp
Band	10q23.33	End	92,695,647 bp

Gene location (Mouse)
Chr.	Chromosome 19 (mouse)
Band	19 C2|19 32.28 cM	Start	37,423,258 bp
Band	19 C2|19 32.28 cM	End	37,429,179 bp
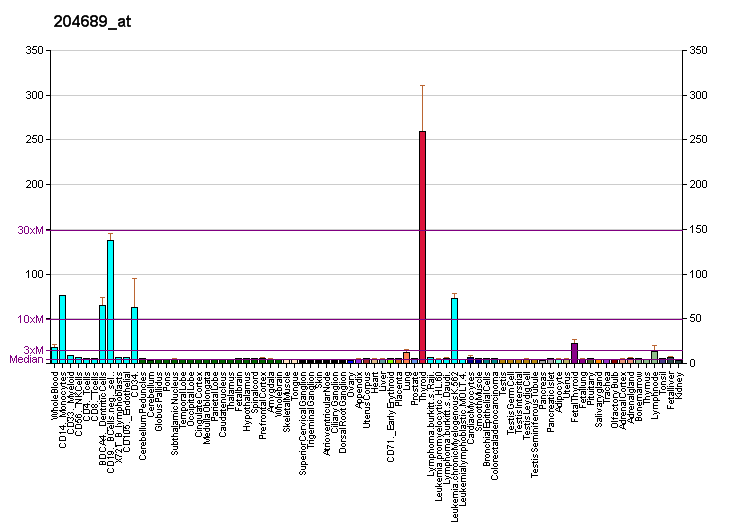

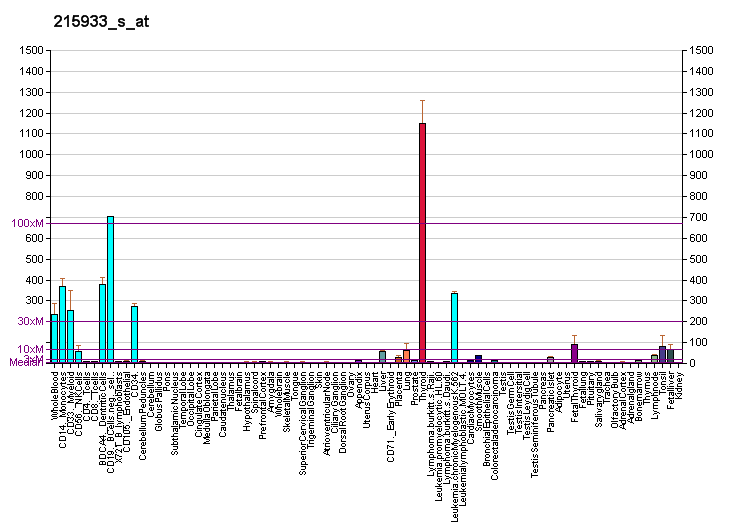
RNA expression pattern
Bgee	Human / Mouse (ortholog); Top expressed in: secondary oocyte; right lobe of thyroid gland; left lobe of thyroid gland; monocyte; right lobe of liver; granulocyte; spleen; body of pancreas; gallbladder; blood / Top expressed in: renal medulla; primary oocyte; outer renal medulla; granulocyte; adrenal gland; zygote; liver; spleen; inner renal medulla; secondary oocyte; More reference expression data
BioGPS	More reference expression data
Gene ontology
Molecular function	sequence-specific DNA binding; DNA binding; RNA polymerase II transcription regulatory region sequence-specific DNA binding; protein homodimerization activity; DNA-binding transcription factor activity; HMG box domain binding; transcription factor binding; chromatin binding; RNA polymerase II cis-regulatory region sequence-specific DNA binding; DNA-binding transcription repressor activity, RNA polymerase II-specific; protein binding; eukaryotic initiation factor 4E binding; TBP-class protein binding; DNA binding, bending; DNA-binding transcription factor activity, RNA polymerase II-specific
Cellular component	cytoplasm; protein-DNA complex; nucleus
Biological process	Notch signaling pathway; myeloid leukocyte differentiation; endoderm development; DNA conformation change; regulation of transcription, DNA-templated; primary lung bud formation; negative regulation of cyclin-dependent protein serine/threonine kinase activity; multicellular organism growth; embryonic organ development; regulation of transcription by RNA polymerase II; negative regulation of vascular endothelial growth factor receptor signaling pathway; interkinetic nuclear migration; negative regulation of transcription by competitive promoter binding; hepatocyte differentiation; in utero embryonic development; negative regulation of transcription by RNA polymerase II; Wnt signaling pathway; tissue morphogenesis; mRNA export from nucleus; transcription, DNA-templated; embryonic heart tube development; vasculogenesis; morphogenesis of an epithelium; poly(A)+ mRNA export from nucleus; positive regulation of Wnt signaling pathway; forebrain morphogenesis; multicellular organism development; hepatoblast differentiation; thyroid gland development; common bile duct development; regulation of cell population proliferation; protein localization to nucleus; gall bladder development; negative regulation of angiogenesis; pancreas development; animal organ morphogenesis; B cell differentiation; hepatic duct development; liver development; negative regulation of transcription by transcription factor localization; forebrain development; cell population proliferation; negative regulation of transcription, DNA-templated; primitive streak formation; anterior/posterior pattern specification; positive regulation of transcription by RNA polymerase II; signal transduction; response to peptide hormone; response to wounding; cell differentiation; hemopoiesis; regulation of leukocyte proliferation
Sources:Amigo / QuickGO
Orthologs
Databases	NCBI: entry; OMA: entry
Species	Human	Mouse
Entrez	3087	15242
Ensembl	ENSG00000152804	ENSMUSG00000024986
UniProt	Q03014	P43120
RefSeq (mRNA)	NM_002729	NM_008245
RefSeq (protein)	NP_002720	NP_032271
Location (UCSC)	Chr 10: 92.69 – 92.7 Mb	Chr 19: 37.42 – 37.43 Mb
PubMed search
- Wikidata
View/Edit Human	View/Edit Mouse

Hematopoietically-expressed homeobox protein HHEX is a protein that in humans is encoded by the HHEX gene and also known as Proline Rich Homeodomain protein PRH.

This gene encodes a member of the homeobox family of transcription factors, many of which are involved in developmental processes. Expression in specific hematopoietic lineages suggests that this protein may play a role in hematopoietic differentiation but the expression of this protein is not limited to hematopoietic cells.

== Function ==
The HHEX transcription factor acts as a activator of transcription in some instances and a repressor of transcription others. It interacts with a number of other signaling molecules to play an important role in the development of multiple organs, such as the liver, thyroid and forebrain. HHEX serves to repress VEGFA, another protein which is important in endothelial cell development. SCL, a significant transcription factor for blood and endothelial cell differentiation, is shown to interact with HHEX to promote the correct development of the hematopoiesis process. HHEX appears to work together with another molecule, β-catenin, for the development of the anterior organizer. It also contributes to developmental remodeling and stabilization of endothelial cells in an unborn organism. The importance of this transcription factor is illustrated by the inability of HHEX knockout mice embryos to survive gestation. Without the expression of HHEX, these mice embryos die in utero between Day 13 and Day 16. HHEX knockout mice display a range of abnormalities including forebrain abnormalities in various levels of severity, as well as a number of other defects including heart, vasculature, liver, monocyte, and thyroid abnormalities. The HHEX protein is important in a variety of cancers and it can act as a tumour suppressor protein or as an oncoprotein depending on the cancer type.

== Interactions ==
HHEX has been shown to interact with Promyelocytic leukemia protein.
