= MYND zinc finger =

zf-MYND
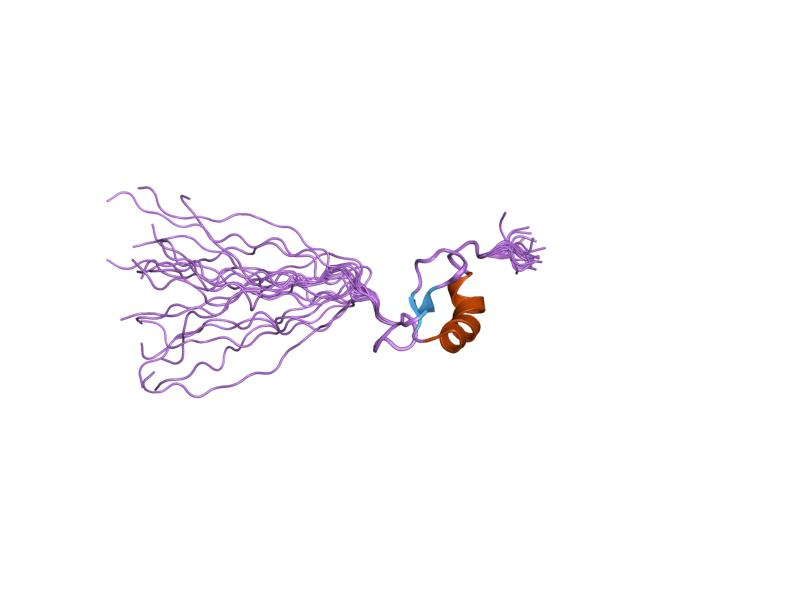
- solution structure of zf-mynd domain of protein cbfa2ti (protein mtg8)

Identifiers
- Symbol: zf-MYND
- Pfam: PF01753
- Pfam clan: CL0175
- InterPro: IPR002893
Available protein structures:
- Pfam: structures / ECOD
- PDB: RCSB PDB; PDBe; PDBj
- PDBsum: structure summary

In molecular biology the MYND-type zinc finger domain is a conserved protein domain. The MYND domain (myeloid, Nervy, and DEAF-1) is present in a large group of proteins that includes RP-8 (PDCD2), Nervy, and predicted proteins from Drosophila, mammals, Caenorhabditis elegans, yeast, and plants. The MYND domain consists of a cluster of cysteine and histidine residues, arranged with an invariant spacing to form a potential zinc-binding motif. Mutating conserved cysteine residues in the DEAF-1 MYND domain does not abolish DNA binding, which suggests that the MYND domain might be involved in protein-protein interactions. Indeed, the MYND domain of ETO/MTG8 interacts directly with the N-CoR and SMRT co-repressors. Aberrant recruitment of co-repressor complexes and inappropriate transcriptional repression is believed to be a general mechanism of leukemogenesis caused by the t(8;21) translocations that fuse ETO with the acute myelogenous leukemia 1 (AML1) protein. ETO has been shown to be a co-repressor recruited by the promyelocytic leukemia zinc finger (PLZF) protein. A divergent MYND domain present in the adenovirus E1A binding protein BS69 was also shown to interact with N-CoR and mediate transcriptional repression. The current evidence suggests that the MYND motif in mammalian proteins constitutes a protein-protein interaction domain that functions as a co-repressor-recruiting interface.
