= Anti-sp100 antibodies =

Schematic representation of antibody.

Anti-sp100 antibodies are found in association with primary biliary cirrhosis. The autoimmune target of anti-sp100 is the sp100 nuclear antigen which was identified by its association with primary biliary cirrhosis. 20-30% of patients with primary biliary cirrhosis have sp100 Abs. The sera of these patients exhibit a characteristic "nuclear dots" pattern in indirect immunofluorescence (IIF) on Hep-2 cells.

== Immunodominant regions of sp100 ==
- Antigenic region 1 - positions 296-311 - Sequence (I K K E K P F **S N S K V E** C Q A)
- Antigenic region 2 - positions 332-351 - Sequence (E G S T D V D **E P L E V F I S A** P R S E)

(Bolded areas represent the core epitope.)
