= Mark Anderson (immunologist) =

American immunologist

- Known for: Research on immune tolerance and regulatory mechanisms in autoimmunity; cancer immunotherapy research
- Awards: Pew Biomedical Scholar (2004) from The Pew Charitable Trusts, and the William B. Coley Award (2024)
- Scientific career
- Fields: Immunology, Immune Tolerance, Autoimmunity
- Institutions: University of California, San Francisco

Mark S. Anderson is an American immunologist and physician–scientist at the University of California, San Francisco (UCSF). He has researched immune tolerance and autoimmunity for cancer immunotherapy. Anderson was a Pew Biomedical Scholar and was named the 2024 recipient of the William B. Coley Award for his research in basic and tumor immunology in cancer immunotherapy.

== Early life and education ==
Anderson received his BA in Biological Sciences at Northwestern University, Chicago, Illinois, and his MD and PhD from University of Chicago, Pritzker School of Medicine, Chicago, Illinois in Immunology. After completing his residency at University of Minnesota Hospital and Clinics, he completed his post-doctoral training in the lab of Diane Mathis and Christophe Benoist at Harvard Medical School, Joslin Diabetes Center, where he discovered that the Aire protein projects an immunological self-shadow within the thymus, a finding that provided insights into the mechanism of central tolerance in autoimmunity.

== Career ==
Anderson currently serves on the faculty at UCSF, where he is the Director of the Diabetes Center at UCSF. He is involved in research on the mechanisms of immune tolerance, autoimmunity, and cancer immunotherapy. He is also the Deputy Director of Immune Tolerance Network (NIAID/NIH) and a board member of the Beatson Foundation and Giannini Foundation, and former President of Federation of Clinical Immunology Societies (FOCIS). He is most interested in identifying the key switches that control immune tolerance.

== Awards and honors ==
Anderson is the recipient of a NIAID/NIH MERIT Award, University of Chicago Medical and Biological Sciences Alumni Association Distinguished Service Award, and the Burroughs Wellcome Fund Clinical Scientist Award in Translational Research. He was also named a Pew Biomedical Scholar in 2004, and in 2024, he received the William B. Coley Award for Cancer Immunotherapy from the Cancer Research Institute in 2020. He was also inducted into the National Academy of Medicine.

== Selected publications ==
- Anderson, MS; Venanzi, ES; Klein, L; Chen, Z; Berzins, SP; Turley, SJ (2002). "Projection of an immunological self shadow within the AIRE protein". Science. 298 (5597): 1395–1401. Bibcode:2002Sci...298.1395A. doi:10.1126/science.1075958. PMID 12376594.
- Bastard, P; Rosen, LB; Zhang, Q (2020). "Autoantibodies against type I IFNs in patients with life-threatening COVID-19". Science. 370 (6515) eabd4585. doi:10.1126/science.abd4585. hdl:10230/53698. PMC 7857397. PMID 32972996.
- Zhang, Q; Bastard, P; Liu, Z; Le Pen, J; Moncada-Velez, M; Chen, J; Ogishi, M (2020). "Inborn errors of type I IFN immunity in patients with life-threatening COVID-19". Science. 370 (6515) eabd4570. doi:10.1126/science.abd4570. hdl:10230/53699. PMC 7857407. PMID 32972995.
- Anderson, MS; Bluestone, JA (2005). "The NOD mouse: a model of immune dysregulation". Annual Review of Immunology. 23 (1): 447–485. doi:10.1146/annurev.immunol.23.021704.115643. PMID 15771578.
- Anderson, MS; Venanzi, ES; Chen, Z; Berzins, SP; Benoist, C; Mathis, D (2005). "The cellular mechanism of Aire control of T cell tolerance". Immunity. 23 (2): 227–239. doi:10.1016/j.immuni.2005.07.005. PMID 16111640.
