= ISG20 =

Protein-coding gene in the species Homo sapiens

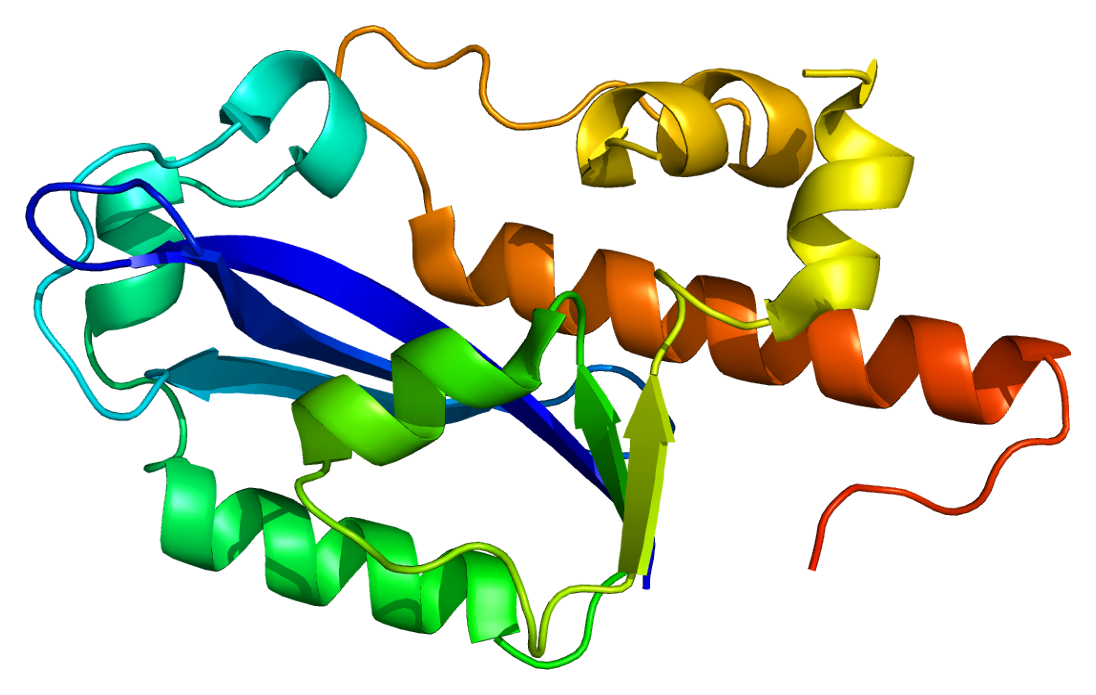

Identifiers
- Aliases: ISG20, CD25, HEM45, interferon stimulated exonuclease gene 20kDa, interferon stimulated exonuclease gene 20
- External IDs: OMIM: 604533; MGI: 1928895; GeneCards: ISG20
Available structures
PDB	Ortholog search: PDBe RCSB
PDB	List of PDB id codes 1WLJ
Enzyme activity
EC #	BRENDA	ExPASy	KEGG	MetaCyc
3.1.13.1	↗	↗	↗	↗

Gene location (Human)
Chr.	Chromosome 15 (human)
Band	15q26.1	Start	88,635,670 bp
Band	15q26.1	End	88,656,483 bp

Gene location (Mouse)
Chr.	Chromosome 7 (mouse)
Band	7|7 D2	Start	78,563,172 bp
Band	7|7 D2	End	78,570,144 bp
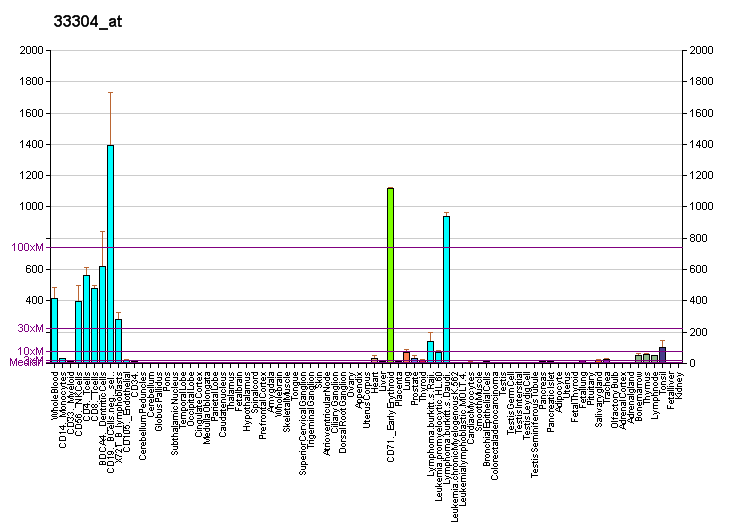

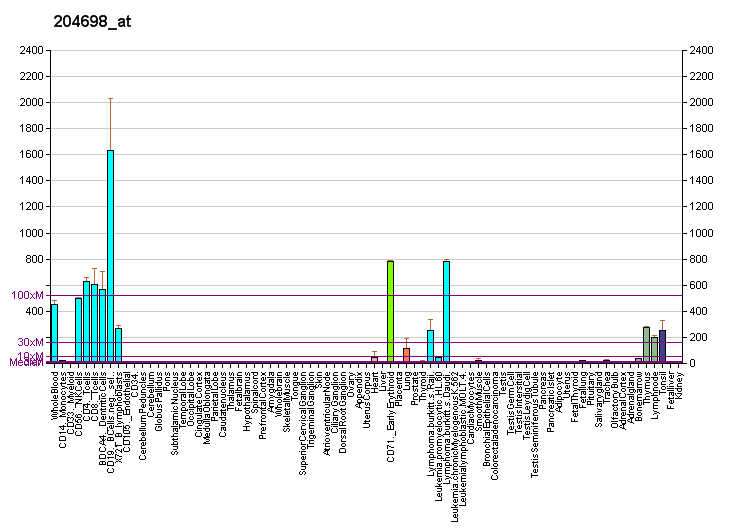
RNA expression pattern
Bgee	Human / Mouse (ortholog); Top expressed in: spleen; blood; granulocyte; lymph node; cartilage tissue; appendix; duodenum; jejunal mucosa; epithelium of nasopharynx; right lung / Top expressed in: tibiofemoral joint; blood; spermatid; islet of Langerhans; spleen; decidua; right lung lobe; gastrula; thymus; fetal liver hematopoietic progenitor cell; More reference expression data
BioGPS	More reference expression data
Gene ontology
Molecular function	3'-5'-exoribonuclease activity; single-stranded DNA 3'-5' exodeoxyribonuclease activity; exoribonuclease II activity; metal ion binding; U3 snoRNA binding; U2 snRNA binding; RNA binding; nucleic acid binding; U1 snRNA binding; nuclease activity; exonuclease activity; hydrolase activity
Cellular component	cytoplasm; Cajal body; PML body; nucleoplasm; nucleolus; nucleus
Biological process	immune system process; response to virus; RNA catabolic process; negative regulation of viral genome replication; DNA catabolic process, exonucleolytic; defense response to virus; type I interferon signaling pathway; rRNA processing; innate immune response; cell population proliferation; RNA phosphodiester bond hydrolysis, exonucleolytic
Sources:Amigo / QuickGO
Orthologs
Databases	NCBI: entry; OMA: entry
Species	Human	Mouse
Entrez	3669	57444
Ensembl	ENSG00000172183	ENSMUSG00000039236
UniProt	Q96AZ6	Q9JL16
RefSeq (mRNA)	NM_001303233; NM_001303234; NM_001303235; NM_001303236; NM_001303237 NM_002201	NM_001113527; NM_001291220; NM_001291221; NM_020583
RefSeq (protein)	NP_001290162; NP_001290163; NP_001290164; NP_001290165; NP_001290166 NP_002192	NP_001106999; NP_001278149; NP_001278150; NP_065608
Location (UCSC)	Chr 15: 88.64 – 88.66 Mb	Chr 7: 78.56 – 78.57 Mb
PubMed search
- Wikidata
View/Edit Human	View/Edit Mouse

Interferon-stimulated gene 20 kDa protein is a protein that in humans is encoded by the ISG20 gene. It belongs to the ISG family of proteins, which are typically stimulated by type I interferon as a response to viral infection.

== Discovery ==
ISG20 was discovered in 1997 at the Institute for Molecular Genetics (IGMM) within the University of Montpellier. The new protein was discovered through differential display in IFNα/β treated human cells.

Later it was shown that ISG20 expression is driven directly by ssDNA and ssRNA signalling through NF-kB pathways, leading to a more robust expression of ISG20, than through the interferon pathway.

== Structure ==
ISG20 is classified as a member of the DEDDh exonuclease family, defined by a conserved catalytic core consisting of three aspartate residues and one glutamate residue distributed across the Exo I–III motifs, together with an additional conserved histidine residue essential for activity.

== Function ==
ISG20 is an RNA exonuclease, which under normal physiological conditions contributes to the antiviral response of the host. It belongs to the Rex4 exonucleases subfamily and is evolutionarily related to yeast REXO4.

It is enzymatically capable of degrading single-stranded RNA and single-stranded DNA alike.

== Clinical significance ==
ISG20 shows somewhat opposing activity in different types of cancers. While it drives cell proliferation in breast cancer, AML, glioma, cervical cancer, renal cancer, liver cancer and oral cancer, it has been shown to inhibit cell proliferation in ovarian cancer.

While the pathophysiological mechanism is not fully understood, it is thought that in the majority of cases where ISG20 has a proliferative effect, thyroid hormone stimulation causes the secretion of ISG20, which in turn contributes to proliferation, stimulates migration and drives angiogenesis. The proliferative effect is mediated via metalloproteinase MMP-9 pathway by accelerating the G1/S transition, while the stimulation of expression of extracellular matrix degrading enzymes drives migration and invasion. Angiogenesis is mediated by Interleukin 8 and the JAK/STAT Pathway.
