= Promyelocytic leukemia protein =

Protein found in humans

PML
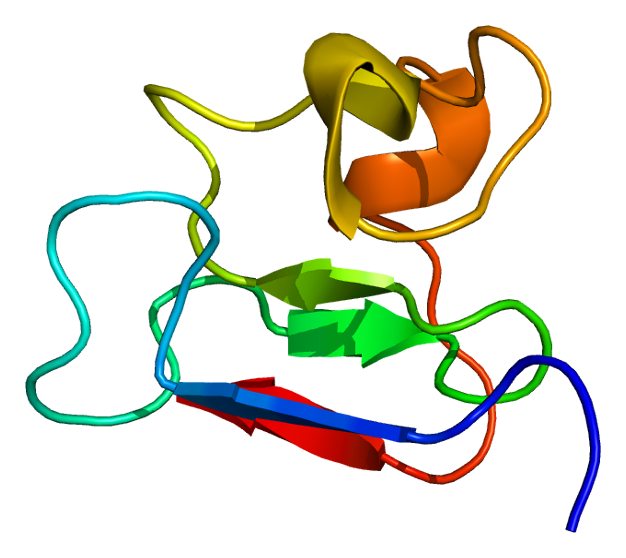

Identifiers
- Aliases: PML, MYL, PP8675, RNF71, TRIM19, Promyelocytic leukemia protein, promyelocytic leukemia, Probable transcription factor PML nuclear body scaffold
- External IDs: OMIM: 102578; MGI: 104662; GeneCards: PML
Available structures
PDB	Ortholog search: PDBe RCSB
PDB	List of PDB id codes 1BOR, 2MVW, 2MWX, 4WJN, 4WJO

Gene location (Human)
Chr.	Chromosome 15 (human)
Band	15q24.1	Start	73,994,673 bp
Band	15q24.1	End	74,047,827 bp

Gene location (Mouse)
Chr.	Chromosome 9 (mouse)
Band	9 B|9 31.63 cM	Start	58,125,359 bp
Band	9 B|9 31.63 cM	End	58,157,069 bp
RNA expression pattern
Bgee	Human / Mouse (ortholog); Top expressed in: body of uterus; upper lobe of left lung; canal of the cervix; ectocervix; right lung; subcutaneous adipose tissue; right uterine tube; apex of heart; right lobe of thyroid gland; left lobe of thyroid gland / Top expressed in: tail of embryo; spleen; lymph node; fetal liver hematopoietic progenitor cell; parotid gland; mesenteric lymph nodes; thymus; bone marrow; blood; tibiofemoral joint; More reference expression data
BioGPS	n/a
Gene ontology
Molecular function	SUMO binding; cobalt ion binding; metal ion binding; protein homodimerization activity; zinc ion binding; protein binding; SMAD binding; DNA binding; transcription coactivator activity; protein heterodimerization activity; ubiquitin protein ligase binding; SUMO transferase activity
Cellular component	cytoplasm; cytosol; endosome; nuclear membrane; membrane; nucleus; nuclear matrix; nucleolus; endoplasmic reticulum; early endosome membrane; intracellular anatomical structure; nucleoplasm; PML body; endoplasmic reticulum membrane; extrinsic component of endoplasmic reticulum membrane; heterochromatin
Biological process	regulation of protein phosphorylation; positive regulation of histone deacetylation; intrinsic apoptotic signaling pathway in response to oxidative stress; myeloid cell differentiation; DNA damage response, signal transduction by p53 class mediator resulting in cell cycle arrest; negative regulation of telomere maintenance via telomerase; rhythmic process; interferon-gamma-mediated signaling pathway; negative regulation of telomerase activity; positive regulation of telomere maintenance; cellular senescence; regulation of cell adhesion; defense response to virus; intrinsic apoptotic signaling pathway in response to DNA damage; positive regulation of extrinsic apoptotic signaling pathway; activation of cysteine-type endopeptidase activity involved in apoptotic process; transforming growth factor beta receptor signaling pathway; proteasome-mediated ubiquitin-dependent protein catabolic process; negative regulation of cell population proliferation; positive regulation of defense response to virus by host; apoptotic process; response to cytokine; cell fate commitment; negative regulation of translation in response to oxidative stress; regulation of transcription, DNA-templated; common-partner SMAD protein phosphorylation; branching involved in mammary gland duct morphogenesis; extrinsic apoptotic signaling pathway; positive regulation of fibroblast proliferation; positive regulation of apoptotic signaling pathway; endoplasmic reticulum calcium ion homeostasis; transcription, DNA-templated; PML body organization; negative regulation of cell growth; intrinsic apoptotic signaling pathway by p53 class mediator; innate immune response; viral process; response to gamma radiation; response to UV; regulation of calcium ion transport into cytosol; positive regulation of protein localization to chromosome, telomeric region; fibroblast migration; protein targeting; immune system process; protein stabilization; positive regulation of apoptotic process involved in mammary gland involution; circadian regulation of gene expression; regulation of MHC class I biosynthetic process; regulation of circadian rhythm; negative regulation of transcription, DNA-templated; maintenance of protein location in nucleus; cellular response to interleukin-4; intrinsic apoptotic signaling pathway in response to DNA damage by p53 class mediator; response to hypoxia; regulation of double-strand break repair; intrinsic apoptotic signaling pathway in response to endoplasmic reticulum stress; retinoic acid receptor signaling pathway; negative regulation of angiogenesis; negative regulation of ubiquitin-dependent protein catabolic process; entrainment of circadian clock by photoperiod; negative regulation of mitotic cell cycle; positive regulation of MHC class I biosynthetic process; positive regulation of transcription by RNA polymerase II; regulation of signal transduction by p53 class mediator; cellular response to leukemia inhibitory factor; protein import into nucleus; protein-containing complex assembly; positive regulation of nucleic acid-templated transcription; protein sumoylation
Sources:Amigo / QuickGO
Orthologs
Databases	NCBI: entry; OMA: entry
Species	Human	Mouse
Entrez	5371	18854
Ensembl	ENSG00000140464	ENSMUSG00000036986
UniProt	P29590	Q60953
RefSeq (mRNA)	NM_033250; NM_002675; NM_033238; NM_033239; NM_033240 NM_033244; NM_033246; NM_033247; NM_033249	NM_008884; NM_178087; NM_001311088
RefSeq (protein)	NP_002666; NP_150241; NP_150242; NP_150243; NP_150247 NP_150249; NP_150250; NP_150252; NP_150253	NP_001298017; NP_032910; NP_835188
Location (UCSC)	Chr 15: 73.99 – 74.05 Mb	Chr 9: 58.13 – 58.16 Mb
PubMed search
- Wikidata
View/Edit Human	View/Edit Mouse

Promyelocytic leukemia protein (PML) (also known as MYL, RNF71, PP8675 or TRIM19) is the protein product of the PML gene. PML protein is a tumor suppressor protein required for the assembly of a number of nuclear structures, called PML-nuclear bodies, which form amongst the chromatin of the cell nucleus. These nuclear bodies are present in mammalian nuclei, at about 1 to 30 per cell nucleus. PML-NBs are known to have a number of regulatory cellular functions, including involvement in programmed cell death, genome stability, antiviral effects and controlling cell division. PML mutation or loss, and the subsequent dysregulation of these processes, has been implicated in a variety of cancers.

== History ==
PML was poorly understood until described in the findings of Grignani et al in their 1996 study of patients with acute promyelocytic leukemia (APL). It was found that the karyotype of 90% of APL patients included a reciprocal translocation, resulting in the fusion of the gene encoding retinoic acid receptor alpha, RARA, of chromosome 17 and the PML gene of chromosome 15, which had not previously been characterized. The resultant PML/RARalpha oncofusion gene was shown to disturb normal PML and RARalpha function, thus inhibiting the terminal differentiation of blood precursor cells and allowing the maintenance of a reserve of undifferentiated cells for cancerous progression. This implication of the PML gene in a pathological context led to a greater focus on the gene in future years.

== Structure ==
The PML gene is roughly 53 kilobase pairs in length and is located on the q arm of chromosome 15. It consists of 10 exons that are subject to shuffling through alternative splicing, yielding more than 15 known PML protein isoforms. While the isoforms vary at their C-terminal domain, they all contain a TRIpartite motif encoded by the first three exons of the gene. The TRIpartite motif consists of a zinc RING finger, two zinc binding domains, termed the B1 and B2 boxes, and an RBCC dimerization domain composed of two alpha helical coiled coil domains.

The PML gene is under transcriptional, translational and post translational control. The promoter region of the gene contains targets of signal transducers and activators of transcription (STATs), interferon regulatory factors, and p53 protein, indicating the intricacy of its involvement in cellular functions. In addition to regulation through alternative splicing, the protein product is subject to post-translational modifications such as acetylation and phosphorylation. The C-terminus contains serine residues that are phosphorylated by casein kinases, and there are several tyrosine and threonine residues which can also be phosphorylation targets. PML phosphorylation triggers further modification through the attachment of SUMO proteins to the RING domain by UBC9 SUMO-conjugating enzyme, which occurs in a cell cycle dependent way. PML contains a SUMO-binding domain necessary for its interaction with other SUMOylated proteins such as itself and many others. Both ubiquitination and SUMOylation of PML protein can trigger its degradation in the proteasome, thus providing a means of modulating PML protein lability within the cell.

PML is translated in the cytoplasm of the cell, but its N-terminus contains a nuclear localization signal which causes its import to the nucleus. Within the nucleus, sumoylated PML proteins multimerize with one another through interactions at the RBCC domain. This forms a ring-like structure that binds to the nuclear matrix, forming a PML-Nuclear body (PML-NB). The edge of the ring-like protein multimer features protein threads that extend out from the ring and make contact with chromatin fibers. This maintains the position of the PML-NBs within the nucleus, as well as the stability of the protein. When the chromatin is stressed, such as during apoptosis, the PML-NB becomes unstable and the PML bodies are redistributed into microstructures. These microstructures contain PML protein but not the many interacting proteins normally associated with PML-NBs.

PML-NBs are not randomly distributed throughout the nucleus, but are found within the nucleus and are commonly associated with other nuclear bodies such as splicing speckles and nucleoli, as well as regions that are rich in genes and are actively being transcribed. Particularly, PML-NB have been shown to associate with genes such as the MHC I cluster of genes, as well as the p53 gene. The exact significance of this association is unclear, however evidence suggests that PML-NBs may influence transcription at these specific gene sites.

== Function ==
The PML-NBs have a wide array of functions, and a large role in cell regulation. They exert their wide range of actions through interactions with varying proteins localized to the PML-NBs. It is thought that the specific biochemical function performed by PML-NBs may be serving as an E3 ligase for the sumoylation of other proteins. The true function, however, remains unclear, and several possible models have been proposed for PML-NB function, including nuclear storage of proteins, serving as a dock where other proteins accumulate to be post-translationally modified, direct involvement with transcription, and chromatin regulation.

PML-NBs also play a role in transcriptional regulation. PML-NBs have been shown to increase the transcription of some genes, while repressing the transcription of other genes. It has been suggested that the mechanism by which PML-NBs do this is via a chromatin-remodelling processes, although this is uncertain.

Due to this apparent contradiction, it is possible that PML-NBs may be heterogeneous structures that have different functions based on their location within the nucleus, the proteins they interact with in a specific area of the nucleus, or the specific PML protein isoforms of which they are composed.

In addition to this regulation of transcription, observations of PML-NBs have strongly suggested that the protein complex plays a role in mediating DNA-damage responses. For example, the number and size of PML-NBs increases as the activities of DNA damage sensors ATM and ATR increase. The nuclear bodies localize to the site of DNA damage, where proteins associated with the repair of DNA and halting of the cell cycle then co-localize. The functional purpose of the interaction between PML-NBs and DNA repair mechanisms remains unclear, but it seems unlikely that they have a role in repairing the DNA directly, due to the co-localization of DNA repair proteins and PML-NBs some time after the DNA has been damaged. Rather, it is thought that PML-NBs may regulate responses to DNA damage by acting as a storage site for proteins involved in DNA repair, regulating the repair directly, or mediating between DNA repair and checkpoint responses. However, it is clear that PML-NBs play a role in mediating checkpoint responses, particularly in causing apoptosis.

PML plays an important role in both p53 dependent and p53-independent apoptotic pathways. PML activates p53 by recruiting the protein to a PML-NBs site and promoting its activation, while inhibiting regulators of the protein such as MDM2 or HAUSP. In pathways that do not use p53 in inducing apoptosis, PML have been shown to interact with CHK2 and induce it to autophosphorylate to become active. In addition to those two apoptotic pathways, Fas-induced apoptosis relies on the PML-NBs to release FLICE-Associated huge protein, which then localizes to the mitochondria to promote the activation of Caspase-8.

Beyond apoptosis, other studies have implicated PML-NBs in cellular senescence, particularly its induction. It has been shown to be involved with the formation of certain chromatin features of cells experiencing senescence, such as senescence-associated heterochromatin foci (SAHFs), which are believed to suppress the expression of growth-promoting factors and genes. The formation of these features is the result of histone chaperones, HIRA and ASF1, whose chromatin remodeling activities here are mediated by the PML-NBs. HIRA localizes to PML-NBs before any other interaction occurs with the DNA.

=== Role in cancer ===
Loss of function mutations of the PML protein, particularly resulting from the fusion of the PML gene with RARA gene in acute promyelocytic leukemias, is implicated in dysregulation of several tumor-suppressing apoptotic pathways, particularly those that rely on p53 as noted above. Thus, the loss of PML function confers a cellular survival and proliferation advantage, impedes cellular senescence through loss of SAHFs, and puts a block on cellular differentiation.

Both humans and mice have been found to demonstrate an increased propensity for tumor formation upon loss of PML function. PML disruption occurs in a wide variety of cancer types, and results in more metastatic tumors, and correspondingly poorer prognoses. It is thought that, beyond the importance it plays in apoptotic roles, PML inactivation may cause cells to favor tumor progression by allowing the cell to accumulate additional genetic damage. Many proteins involved in genomic stability maintenance rely on the PML-NBs for targeting, and PML loss thus leads to a decrease in repair efficiency within the cell.

=== Cell cycle role ===
PML-NB distribution and concentration changes as the cell moves through the cell cycle. In G0 phase, few sumoylated PML-NBs are present, but their numbers increase as the cell progresses through G1 to S to G2 stages. During the chromatin condensation occurring during mitosis, the desumoylation of PML causes the dissociation of many associated factors, and the PML proteins self aggregate to form a few, large, aggregates termed mitotic accumulations of PML proteins (MAPPs). In addition to changes in numbers, PML-NBs also associate with different proteins over the lifetime of the cycle, and undergo significant biochemical changes in composition.

During the S phase of the cell cycle, PML-NB complexes break apart as their chromatin scaffold changes during replication. The physical breaking of the PML-NBs into smaller fragments promotes the creation of more PML-NBs that exist in G2, however, the expression levels of the PML protein hasn't increased. It is thought that this may serve to preserve the orientation of the chromatids with which the PML-NBs are associated, or monitor the integrity of replication forks.

=== Antiviral functions ===
Transcription of PML is increased by the presence of interferon α/β and γ. It is thought that the increased numbers of PML-NBs that result from this increase in expression of the PML protein may result in the sequestering of viral proteins in the PML-NBs. Thus, the virus is unable to make use of them. The proteins held by PML-NBs are then sumoylated, inactivating the virions permanently.

== Interactions ==
Promyelocytic leukemia protein has been shown to interact with:

- ANKRD2,
- CREB-binding protein,
- Cyclin T1,
- Death associated protein 6,
- GATA2,
- HDAC1,
- HDAC3,
- HHEX,
- MAPK11,
- MYB,
- Mdm2,
- Nerve Growth factor IB,
- Nuclear receptor co-repressor 1,
- Nuclear receptor co-repressor 2,
- P53,
- RPL11,
- Retinoblastoma protein,
- Retinoic acid receptor alpha,
- SIN3A,
- SKI protein,
- STAT3,
- Serum response factor and
- Small ubiquitin-related modifier 1,
- Sp1 transcription factor,
- TOPBP1,
- Thymine-DNA glycosylase, and
- Zinc finger and BTB domain-containing protein 16.
- PER2,
- BMAL1,
- CLOCK,

== See also ==
- RING finger domain
