= Diane Mathis =

American immunologist

- Education: Wake Forest University; University of Rochester
- Scientific career
- Workplaces: Harvard Medical School

Diane J. Mathis is the Morton Grove-Rasmussen chair of immunohematology at Harvard Medical School. Her research laboratory, first at the IGBMC in Strasbourg, then at Harvard Medical School, has made pioneering contributions in the area of immunological tolerance, and how cells of the immune system modulate the activity of other organ systems. She has been recognized for her research with elections to the National Academy of Sciences and American Academy of Arts and Sciences.

== Education ==
Mathis received her BS from Wake Forest University and her PhD with Martin Gorovsky at the University of Rochester. She did postdoctoral research with Pierre Chambon at the Laboratoire de Génétique Moléculaire des Eucaryotes in Strasbourg, France, and with Hugh McDevitt at Stanford.

== Career ==
Mathis returned to the Institut de Genetique et de Biologie Moleculaire et Cellulaire in France, and established a lab in collaboration with Christophe Benoist. Mathis and Benoist moved their lab to Harvard Medical School and the Joslin Diabetes Center in Boston in 1999. In 2009, she joined the Department of Immunology at Harvard Medical School, where she and Benoist continue to operate a joint lab. She currently holds the Morton Grove-Rasmussen Chair of immunohematology, and is an associate member of the Broad Institute.

Her research focuses on T cell tolerance and autoimmunity, for instance as it applies to the development of type I diabetes., and more generally on the different mechanisms used by the immune system to promote tolerance to self (AIRE gene, Treg cells), and also to help maintain homeostasis in non-immunological tissues.

Mathis was elected to the National Academy of Sciences in 2003 and the American Academy of Arts and Sciences in 2012. Columbia University recognized her contributions to the understanding of type I diabetes with the 2012 Naomi Berrie Award. In 2017, she received the FASEB Excellence in Science Award., in 2018 the Rabbi Shai Shaknai Award (2018), and in 2024 the William B. Coley Award.
