= DEAF1 =

Protein/gene that regulates mTORC1 expression

Identifiers
- Aliases: DEAF1, MRD24, NUDR, SPN, ZMYND5, transcription factor, DEAF1 transcription factor, NEDHELS, VSVS
- External IDs: OMIM: 602635; MGI: 1858496; GeneCards: DEAF1
Available structures
| PDB | Ortholog search: PDBe RCSB |
| PDB | List of PDB id codes 2JW6, 4A24 |

Gene location (Human)
| Chr. | Chromosome 11 (human) |
| Band | 11p15.5 | Start | 644,233 bp |
| Band | 11p15.5 | End | 707,118 bp |

Gene location (Mouse)
| Chr. | Chromosome 7 (mouse) |
| Band | 7|7 F5 | Start | 140,877,093 bp |
| Band | 7|7 F5 | End | 140,907,603 bp |
RNA expression pattern
| Bgee | Human / Mouse (ortholog); Top expressed in: amygdala; hippocampus proper; anterior cingulate cortex; right frontal lobe; prefrontal cortex; dorsolateral prefrontal cortex; nucleus accumbens; right hemisphere of cerebellum; putamen; hypothalamus / Top expressed in: dentate gyrus of hippocampal formation granule cell; tail of embryo; neural layer of retina; Meckel's cartilage; genital tubercle; ventricular zone; superior frontal gyrus; lacrimal gland; primary visual cortex; lip; More reference expression data |
| BioGPS | n/a |
Gene ontology
| Molecular function | DNA binding; DNA-binding transcription factor activity; metal ion binding; protein binding; RNA polymerase II transcription regulatory region sequence-specific DNA binding; DNA-binding transcription repressor activity, RNA polymerase II-specific; DNA-binding transcription factor activity, RNA polymerase II-specific |
| Cellular component | cytoplasm; transcription regulator complex; extracellular region; fibrillar center; nucleus |
| Biological process | visual learning; germ cell development; regulation of transcription, DNA-templated; regulation of transcription by RNA polymerase II; anatomical structure morphogenesis; regulation of mammary gland epithelial cell proliferation; transcription by RNA polymerase II; behavioral fear response; transcription, DNA-templated; nervous system development; embryonic skeletal system development; positive regulation of transcription, DNA-templated; multicellular organism development; neural tube closure; negative regulation of transcription, DNA-templated; negative regulation of transcription by RNA polymerase II |
Sources:Amigo / QuickGO
Orthologs
| Databases | NCBI: entry; OMA: entry |
| Species | Human | Mouse |
| Entrez | 10522 | 54006 |
| Ensembl | ENSG00000282712; ENSG00000177030 | ENSMUSG00000058886 |
| UniProt | O75398 | Q9Z1T5 |
| RefSeq (mRNA) | NM_001293634; NM_021008; NM_001367390 | NM_001282072; NM_001282073; NM_001282076; NM_016874 |
| RefSeq (protein) | NP_001280563; NP_066288; NP_001354319 | NP_001269001; NP_001269002; NP_001269005; NP_058570 |
| Location (UCSC) | Chr 11: 0.64 – 0.71 Mb | Chr 7: 140.88 – 140.91 Mb |
| PubMed search |
- Wikidata
| View/Edit Human | View/Edit Mouse |

The DEAF1 transcription factor (HGNC:14677) (or "deformed epidermal autoregulatory factor 1) is a protein coded by the gene DEAF1 in humans. It is a member of the Zinc finger protein and MYND-type protein. It and its orthologs are found in vertebrate and some invertebrate genuses, notably Drosophila.

== Pathology ==
Mutations affecting the SAND Domain of DEAF1 cause intellectual disability with severe speech impairment and behavioral troubles.

DEAF1 was implicated in muscle dysregulation during aging by switching on excess activity in the mTORC1 transcription factor and disrupting protein exchange. In mice models, physical activity was reported to lower DEAF1 levels, allowing protein exchange to normalize.
