= Buttock augmentation =

Cosmetic and corrective surgery

Gluteoplasty
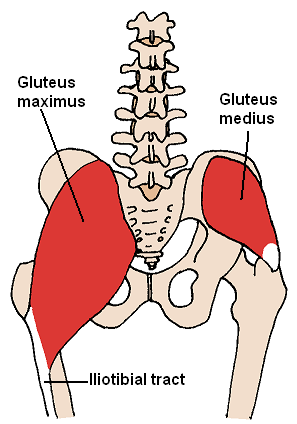
- Gluteoplasty: the relative anatomic locations of the buttocks muscles, considered for buttocks augmentation.
- Specialty: Plastic surgeon

Gluteoplasty or buttock augmentation (from Greek: gloutós γλουτός, 'rump' + plastos πλαστός, 'shaped, formed, moulded') denotes the plastic surgery and the liposuction procedures for the correction of congenital, traumatic, and acquired defects/deformities of the buttocks and the anatomy of the gluteal region; and for the aesthetic enhancement (by augmentation or by reduction) of the contour of the buttocks.

The procedures for buttock augmentation and buttock repair include the surgical emplacement of a gluteal implant (buttock prosthesis); liposculpture (fat transfer and liposuction); and body contouring (surgery, liposculpture, and Sculptra injections) to resolve the patient's particular concern or deformity of the gluteal region.

== Background ==
The functional purpose of the buttocks musculature is to establish a stable gait (balanced walk) for the person who requires the surgical correction of either a defect or a deformity of the gluteal region; therefore, the restoration of anatomic functionality is the therapeutic consideration that determines which gluteoplasty procedure will effectively correct the damaged muscles of the buttocks. The applicable techniques for surgical and correction include the surgical emplacement of gluteal implants; autologous tissue-flaps; the excision (cutting and removal) of damaged tissues; lipoinjection augmentation; and liposuction reduction—to resolve the defect or deformity caused by a traumatic injury (blunt, penetrating, blast) to the buttocks muscles (gluteus maximus, gluteus medius, gluteus minimus), and any deformation of the anatomic contour of the buttocks. Likewise, the corrective techniques apply to resolving the sagging skin of the body, and the muscle and bone deformities presented by the formerly obese patient, after a massive weight loss (MWL) bariatric surgery procedure; and for resolving congenital defects and congenital deformities of the gluteal region.

== Surgical anatomy of the buttocks ==
Muscular origins and insertions

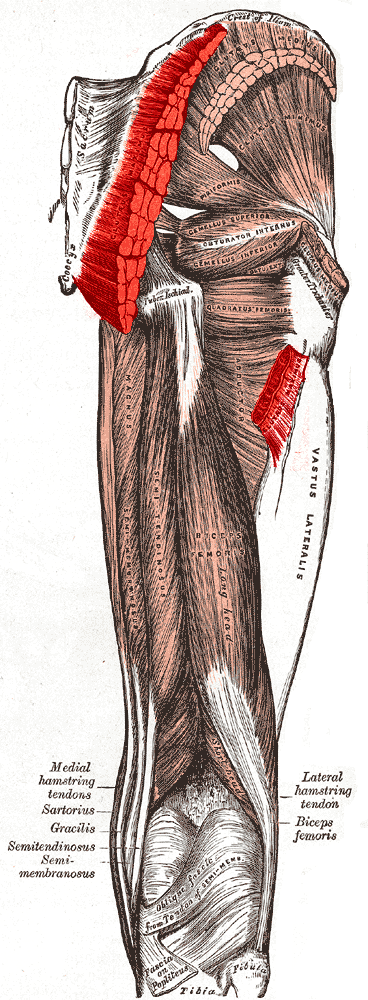
Gluteoplasty: The surgical anatomy of the gluteus maximus muscle, as considered for a buttock-lift surgery.

Anatomically, the mass of each buttock principally comprises two muscles—the gluteus maximus muscle and the gluteus medius muscle—which are covered by a layer of adipose body fat. The upper aspects of the buttocks end at the iliac crest (the upper edges of the wings of the ilium, and the upper lateral margins of the greater pelvis), and the lower aspects of the buttocks end at the horizontal gluteal crease, where the buttocks anatomy joins the rear, upper portion of the thighs. The gluteus maximus muscle has two points of insertion: (i) the one-third superior portion of the (coarse line) linea aspera of the thigh bone (femur), and (ii) the superior portion of the iliotibial tract (a long, fibrous reinforcement of the deep fascia lata of the thigh). The left and the right gluteus maximus muscles (the butt cheeks) are vertically divided by the intergluteal cleft (the butt-crack) which contains the anus.

The gluteus maximus muscle is a large and very thick muscle (6–7 cm) located on the sacrum, which is the large, triangular bone located at the base of the vertebral column, and at the upper- and back-part of the pelvic cavity, where it is inserted (like a wedge) between the two hip bones. The upper part of the sacrum is connected to the final lumbar vertebra (L5), and to the bottom of the coccyx (tailbone). At its origin, the gluteus maximus muscle extends to include parts of the iliac bone, the sacrum, the coccyx, the sacrosciatic ligament, and the tuberosity of the ischium.

Like every pelvic-area muscle, the gluteus maximus muscle originates from the pelvis; nonetheless, it is the sole pelvic muscle not inserted to the trochanter (head of the femur), and is approximately aligned to the femur and the fascia lata (the deep fascia of the thigh); the tissues of the gluteus maximus muscle cover only the rear, lateral face of the trochanter, and there form a bursa (purse) that faces the interior of the thigh.

=== Innervation ===
The motor innervation of the gluteus maximus muscle is performed by the inferior gluteal nerve (a branch nerve of the sacral plexus) and extends from the pelvis to the gluteal region, then traverses the greater sciatic foramen (opening) from behind and to the middle to then join the sciatic nerve. The inferior gluteal nerve divides into three collateral branches: (i) the gluteus branch, (ii) the perineal branch, and (iii) the femoral branch. The first ramification—the gluteus branch—is a branch nerve that is very close to the emergence of the inferior gluteal nerve to the area, next to the inferior border of the pyramidalis muscle.

In surgical and body contouring praxis, the plastic surgeon creates the implant-pocket—either for the gluteal prosthesis or for the injections of autologous fat—by undermining the gluteus maximus muscle with a dissection technique that avoids the sacrum, the sacrotuberous ligament, and the tuberosity of the ischium; which, if accidentally cut, might isolate the posterior (back) portion of the muscle and lead to denervation, the loss of nerve function and of innervation.

=== Vascularization ===
The superior gluteal artery, the inferior gluteal artery, the superior gluteal veins, and the inferior gluteal veins irrigate the gluteus maximus muscle with arterial and venous blood. The vascularization, the entrance of the blood vessels to the muscle tissues, occurs at the anterior (front) face of the muscle, very close to the sacrum. As the arteries and the veins enter the mass of the gluteal muscle, they divide into narrower blood-vessel ramifications (configured like the horizontal branches of a tree), most of which travel parallel to the muscle fibres.

In surgical and body contouring praxis, the plastic surgeon effects the implant-pocket undermining of the gluteus maximus muscle by carefully separating the muscle fibres to avoid severing the pertinent blood vessels, which would interfere with the blood irrigation of the muscle tissue. Therefore, to create an implant-pocket, either for a gluteal prosthesis or for lipoinjection, a low-angle muscle-dissection is performed in order to avoid the risk of severing any major branch—superior or inferior—of the gluteal artery, which travels very close to the sacrum and to the sacrotuberous ligament.

== Surgical procedures ==
=== Surgical therapy ===
While the resolution of the defects and deformities of the gluteal region can be realized surgically, the assessment of the degree of severity of the injury organizes treatment therapies into three types: (i) buttocks augmentation, (ii) buttocks reduction, and (iii) contour irregularity treatments that combine surgery and liposculpture (liposuction and fat-injection).

=== Buttocks augmentation treatments ===
==== Gluteal implants ====
The augmentation of the buttocks is realized with a gluteal implant, which is emplaced under each gluteus maximus muscle; the insertion of the buttock prosthesis is through a midline incision (5–8-cm-wide) over the tailbone (coccyx). Augmentation with a gluteal implant is the method most effective for enlarging the buttocks of a patient whose body possesses few stores of excess adipose fat in the lower portion of the trunk, the buttocks and thighs, the anatomic regions where the human body usually stores excess body fat. Post-operatively, because of the cutting (incising) into the flesh of the tailbone muscles, the full healing of the augmented tissues can be approximately 6–8 months, in the course of which the gluteal-muscle tissues relax, and the settled buttocks prostheses are integrated to the gluteal region. The implantation procedure can be performed upon a patient who is either sedated or anaesthetized, either under general anaesthesia or under local anaesthesia. The usual operating-room time for a buttocks augmentation procedure is approximately two hours. The procedure can be managed either as an overnight in-patient treatment or as a hospital outpatient treatment. Given the nature of the surgical incisions to the gluteus maximus muscles, the therapeutic management of post-surgical pain (at the surgical-wound sites) and normal tissue-healing usually require a four to six-week convalescence, after which the patient resumes their normal-life activities.

==== Lipoinjection ====
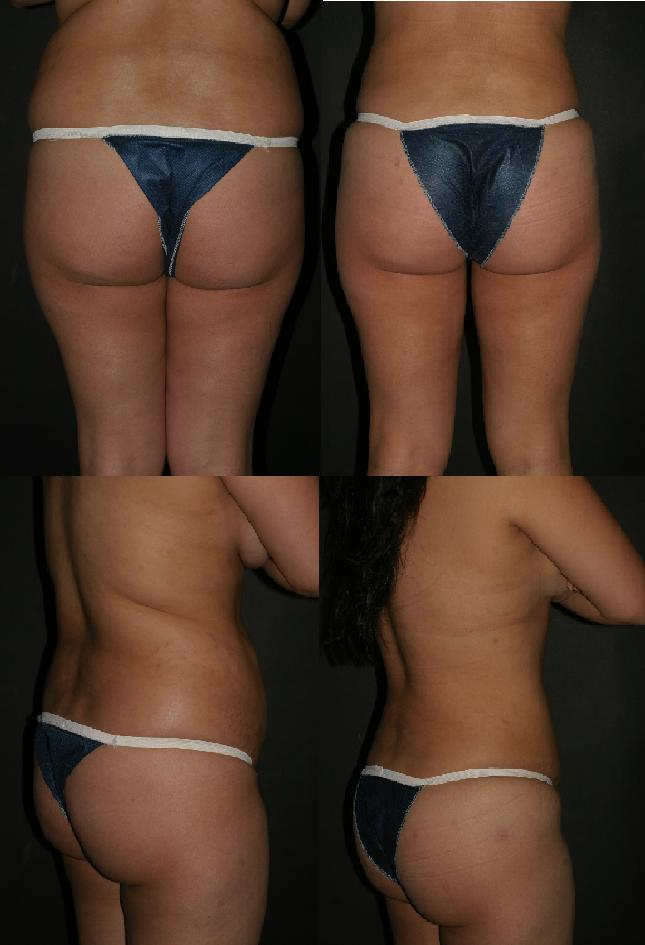
Preoperative (left) and postoperative (right) of lipoinjection to the buttocks, with lipectomy of the abdomen, upper back, hips, mons pubis, and inner thighs.

The augmentation and contouring of the buttocks with autologous fat transfer (lipoinjection) therapy is realized with the excess adipose-fat tissue harvested from the abdomen, flanks, and thighs of the patient. In 1987 Dr. Eduardo Krulig, a Venezuelan plastic surgeon, described the technique, using the name "lipoinjection" for the first time, mentioning the regions of the body where the technique is useful. The gentle liposuction applied to harvest the autologous fat minimally disturbs the local tissues, especially the connective-tissue layer between the skin and the immediate subcutaneous muscle tissues. Then, the harvested fat is injected to the pertinent body area of the gluteal region, through a fine-gauge cannula inserted through a small surgical incision, which produces a short and narrow scar. Lipoinjection contouring and augmentation with the patient's own body fat avoids the possibility of tissue rejection, and is physically less invasive than buttocks-implant surgery. Therefore, depending upon the health of the patient, the convalescence period allows them to resume daily, normal-life activities at two days post-operative, and the full spectrum of physical activity at two weeks post-operative. Furthermore, the liposuction harvesting of the patient's excess body fat improves the aesthetic appearance of the body fat donor-sites. Nonetheless, physiologically, the human body's normal health-management chemistry does resorb (break down and eliminate) some of the injected adipose-fat tissue, and so might diminish the augmentation. According to the degree of diminishment of the volume and contour caused by the fat-resorption, the patient might require additional sessions of fat-transfer therapy to achieve the desired size, shape, and contour of the buttocks.

In common parlance, lipoinjection into the buttocks for aesthetic purposes is often called a Brazilian butt lift (BBL). This name is suggested to originate from the Brazilian surgeon Ivo Pitanguy, who pioneered the surgery in the 1960s. The popularity of the surgery significantly increased during the 2010s as a result of social media trends.

==== Body contouring ====
The augmentation of the buttocks, by rearranging and enhancing the pertinent muscle and fat tissues of the gluteal region, is realized with a combined gluteoplasty procedure of surgery (subcutaneous dermal-fat flaps) and liposculpture (fat-suction, fat-injection). Therapeutically, such a combined correction-and-enhancement procedure is a realistic and feasible lower-body-lift treatment for the patient who has undergone massive weight loss (MWL) in the course of resolving obesity with bariatric surgery. In the case of the patient who presents under-projected, flat buttocks (gluteal hypoplasia), and a degree of gluteal-muscle ptosis (prolapsation, falling forward), wherein neither gluteal-implant surgery nor lipoinjection would be adequate to restoring the natural anatomic contour of the gluteal region, the application of a combined treatment of autologous dermal-fat flap surgery and lipoinjection can achieve the required functional correction and aesthetic contour.

=== Buttocks reduction treatments ===
The methods for reducing the size of the buttocks include the varieties of liposuction, such as lipectomy (with and without ultrasonic enhancement) to reduce excess body fat, and superficial liposculpture, to reshape, refine, and re-establish the natural contour of the body. The usual buttocks-reduction treatment is lipectomy with applied tumescence and anaesthesia, wherein the body fat is harvested by aspiration (suction) through a small-gauge cannula (2–4 mm) that is inserted through a small incision, either to the intergluteal sulcus (the butt-crack), or to the upper area of the gluteus maximus muscle proper.

==== Ultrasonic lipectomy ====
Ultrasonically assisted liposuction can quickly remove a large volume of body fat for the correction of a notable occurrence of lipodystrophy, a deposit of adipose fat to the buttocks and related anatomic areas. The ultrasonic liposuction machine liquefies the excess fat tissue, and so more readily facilitates its removal with conventional suction-lipectomy. The quick fat-harvesting allowed by the ultrasonic lipectomy technique has eliminated the larger (long and wide) surgical incisions that once were required for removing a large volume of adipose tissue. Nonetheless, because of the sensitivity of the gluteal-region tissues, the skin of the pertinent donor-site is cooled in order to prevent ultrasonic heat damage caused by the liquefying and removal of the excess adipose fat.

==== Superficial liposculpture ====
Reshaping the buttocks with liposculpture is performed with a small cannula (2 mm) specifically for contouring superficial body fat, the configuration of which (number of open ports) is determined by the type and the degree of gluteal correction to be realized. To sculpt rounded contours to square-shaped buttocks muscles, superficial liposculpture allows the plastic surgeon to control the injection-rate of the fat-volume. Moreover, superficial liposuction can be combined with other treatment methods for contouring the gluteal region to achieve the required functional, anatomic correction, and the aesthetic enhancement sought by the patient, such as reshaping the lateral area of the buttocks into an athletic form. The study Contouring the Gluteal Region with Tumescent Liposculpture (2011) indicated that effective, gluteal-region contouring is best achieved by tailoring the liposuction-reduction and the lipoinjection-augmentation techniques to the anatomic topography of the body areas to be corrected. Furthermore, the study Contouring of the Gluteal Region in Women: Enhancement and Augmentation (2011) indicated that natural contours of the buttocks and the thighs are effectively achieved with a combined gluteoplasty of selective liposuction and lipoinjection, which reduces the need for aggressive surgical procedures, decreases the risk of medical complications, abbreviates wound-recovery-time, and lessens post-operative scarring. Combined with any buttocks-correction method, superficial liposculpture facilitates the treatment of contour irregularities, the surgical revision of scars, and the correction of gluteal-region contour depressions.

== Surgical technique ==
=== Pre-operative matters ===
To meet the functional requirements and the aesthetic expectations (body image) of the patient, the plastic surgeon establishes a realistic and feasible surgery plan by which to correct the anatomic contour deficiencies of the gluteal region. The surgeon and the patient determine the location of the surgical-wound scars, and determine the best operative position, to allow the proper exposure of the pertinent anatomy to be corrected. Because the surgical procedure requires the tumescence and anaesthesia of the gluteal-region area to be corrected, the physician and the anaesthesiologist determine the volumes of the anaesthetic and tumescent fluids to be administered to the patient during the procedure, and so avoid the risks of drugs overdose and toxicity.

=== Operative matters ===
For a lipoinjection augmentation, the surgeon first dissects and prepares the augmentation-pocket to which will be injected the autologous fat-tissue. The surgical creation (muscle dissection) of the augmentation-pocket avoids the gluteal innervation (superior gluteal nerve and inferior gluteal nerve) and the vascular system (venous and arterial) of the gluteus maximus muscle. Afterwards, the surgeon sutures the dissection-incision and secures it with adhesive tape to ensure that the augmentation-pocket remains open, as dissected, ready to receive the injections of adipose fat. For the revision of scars, with surgery and injections of autologous fat, or with allopathic synthetic fillers, the surgeon applies subcuticular closures to the incision wounds, which then are bandaged.

== Post-operative matters ==
After completing the surgical corrections and the lipoinjection contouring of the pertinent area(s) of the gluteal region, the surgeon thoroughly examines the patient to ensure his or her general recovery from the operation, and examines each surgical incision to ascertain that it is correctly sutured and taped, in order to facilitate the uneventful healing of the gluteus-muscle tissues, without medical complications. The patient is advised to avoid exercise and strenuous physical activity until three weeks post-operative, how to properly care for surgical-incision wounds, and how to wear a compression garment that will keep in place the surgically corrected tissues, and so ensure their healing as a whole anatomic unit of the gluteal region.

When a patient has undergone a surgical contouring of the buttocks with gluteal implants, the final, corrected body contour usually is observed at six months post-operative or at one year post-operative, depending upon the tissue-healing capabilities of the patient's body. The liposculpture patient usually requires approximately six months, and occasionally one year before producing the final, corrected body contour. For both procedures, at approximately one month post-operative, marked aesthetic improvement is noticeable in the corrected body areas, as is the elimination of the initial, post-operative weight gain caused by the body's retention of the infiltrated anaesthetic and tumescent fluids. The patient is advised to wear a compression garment to contain swelling and to immobilize the corrected tissues, so that they heal as one anatomic unit of the gluteal region. Moreover, throughout the convalescence, to facilitate shrinking the skin to the new, corrected body contour, and to resolve unevenness, wrinkles to the skin, and localized swelling, the continual application of massage and (occasional) ultrasound treatments can facilitate the diminishment of the post-operative conditions.

== Dangers and complications ==
Of the three general methods of gluteal augmentation procedures, including implants, flaps and fat graft, a 2019 systemic literature review with meta-analysis of 46 publications revealed fat graft with the least complication rate (7%) while implants associated with highest complication rate (31%). The surgical and liposculpture contouring of the human body presents possible medical complications such as: the psychological—unmet body image expectations of aesthetic improvement; the physical—uneven contour, local and general; the physiologic—toxic reactions to the anaesthesic and the tumescent drugs; and the nervous—paresthesia, localized areas of perduring numbness in the corrected portion(s) of the gluteal region. The medical complications possible to a surgical buttocks augmentation procedure, the submuscular emplacement of a gluteal implant, include infection, surgical-wound dehiscence that exposes the implant, revision surgery, rupture of the implant, seroma (a pocket of clear serous fluid), capsular contracture, asymmetry of the corrected area, shifting of the implant, surgical over-correction, injury to the sciatic nerve, and paresthesia (tingling skin). The medical complications possible to a liposculpture buttocks augmentation include the bodily resorption of some of the injected adipose fat, asymmetric contour of the corrected body area, an irregular contour to the body, seroma, abscess (pus enclosed by inflamed tissue), cellulitis (subcutaneous connective-tissue inflammation), and paresthesia.

Like most medical procedures, buttock augmentation comes with risks, some of which can be life-threatening. A total of 413 Mexican plastic surgeons reported 64 deaths related to liposuction, with 13 deaths caused by gluteal lipoinjection. In Colombia, nine deaths were documented. Of the 13 deaths in Mexico, eight (61.6 percent) occurred during lipoinjection, whereas the remaining five (38.4 percent) occurred within the first 24 hours. In Colombia, six deaths (77.7 percent) occurred during surgery and three occurred (22.2 percent) immediately after surgery. Secondary lymphoedema of the lower extremities has been reported as an unusual side effect of liquid silicone injection on the hips and buttock while thromboembolism, implant displacement and explosion have also been listed as some of the dangers.

=== Unmet expectations ===
In the surgical praxis of body contouring therapy, the patient's body-image expectations can be different from the contoured body that is the outcome of the performed surgical operation. Such unmet aesthetic expectations can be avoided at the pre-operative consultation stage, whereby, with informed consent, the physician and the patient jointly establish a realistic and feasible surgery plan to achieve a mutually satisfactory corrective outcome (functional and aesthetic) of the operation to the gluteal region, the buttock- and thigh-areas.

=== Contour problems ===
Contour problems of the corrected gluteal region can be prevented with the operational use of small-gauge cannulas (ca. 2.0 mm) specifically for superficial liposuction; and with the application of cross-pattern harvesting of the excess body fat, to avoid removing too much adipose fat tissue, which might disfigure the contour of the patient's fat-donor area. The possible contour problems that might arise from ultrasonic liposuction are skin burns and hypertrophic scarring, which might occur if the fat-donor area skin is not cooled and protected during the fat harvest. To that end, the infusion of a tumescence-inducing solution to the fat-donor area(s) assists in cooling the patient's skin during the ultrasonic lipo-harvesting; likewise, the application of moist towels, a skin protector, and the constant cooling-fluid infiltration of the cannula in an integrated sheath.

=== Drug complications (anaesthetic and tumescent) ===
The infiltration of a solution of anaesthesia- and tumescence-inducing drugs can present medical complications such as a fluid overload of the tissues, the inadequate replacement of the infiltrated solution, and the partitioning (separation) of a single infiltration into several pools, which then are removed by suction lipectomy. Moreover, during anaesthesia, maintaining the patient's stable blood pressure can be difficult, which increases the possibility of bleeding, and the possibility that anaesthetic toxicity can occur if excessive doses are administered by infiltration; the symptoms are manifested as central nervous system (CNS) occurrences of drug-induced anxiety, apprehension, restlessness, nervousness, disorientation, confusion, dizziness, blurred vision, tremors, nausea, vomiting, shivering, and seizures; likewise, as manifestations of drowsiness, unconsciousness, respiratory depression, and respiratory arrest. Furthermore, the toxicity symptoms of a tumescence-inducing drug (e.g. epinephrine) might cause such CNS symptoms, for which reason the operative application of a tumescent drug is limited throughout the operation.

=== Numbness (paresthesia) ===
Post-operatively, local areas of numbness (paresthesia) might occur in the contoured portion(s) of the gluteal region, and might perdure for a long time after the surgery. Hence, the patient is advised to facilitate the re-sensitizing of the numb area(s) with applications of gentle massage, to prevent the development of a neuroma complication, and to alleviate pain. Nonetheless, depending upon the tissue-healing capabilities of the patient, he or she can recover in full at two years post-operative.

== Outcomes ==
The outcome of a buttocks-contouring procedure depends upon the specific defect or deformity. Depressed scars and deep morphological defects are difficult to correct because of the curvature of the buttocks as an anatomic unit, and because of the scar-contracting elements of the tissues across the gluteal curvature. In such a case, although the injection of (autologous or artificial) tissue fillers to correct the defect or the deformity might be impermanent, that injection usually will remedy the functional and aesthetic shortcoming(s) required by the patient and will thus serve the therapeutic purpose of gluteoplasty.

== Popularity ==
In common parlance, "Brazilian butt lift" (BBL) is often used to describe lipoinjection into the buttocks for aesthetic purposes. This name is suggested to originate from the Brazilian surgeon Ivo Pitanguy, who pioneered the surgery in the 1960s. The popularity of the surgery significantly increased during the 2010s and 2020s as a result of social media trends.
