= Reith =

Reith is a Scottish surname, and may refer to:

- Charles Reith, Scottish police historian
- John Reith (general)
- John Reith, 1st Baron Reith, Scottish broadcasting executive (Lord Reith of the BBC)
- Douglas Reith, British actor
- Peter Reith, Australian politician
- Sheila Reith, British inventor and physician, co-inventor of the insulin pen

== Origin ==
The origin of this Scottish surname is uncertain. However, there are explanations as to its origin:

- It may be an anglicized and reduced form of Mac Raith, meaning 'son of grace' (see McRae).
- Another possibility is that it is a habitational name and comes from a Cumbric or Pictish cognate of Welsh rhyd, meaning 'ford'.
- A less likely explanation is that it denoted somebody originally from Reeth, Northern England.
- It could, at least in some cases, be a variation of Reid.

In North America, this surname has absorbed several like-sounding surnames.

== See also ==
- Baron Reith
- Reith (Magna Carta)
- Wreath
