= BST =

BST, Bst or bst may refer to:

== Time zones ==
- Bangladesh Standard Time, the time zone of Bangladesh, at UTC+6:00
- Bering Standard Time, a former timezone of Alaska, at UTC−11:00
- British Summer Time, the daylight saving time zone for the United Kingdom, at UTC+1:00
- Burma Standard Time, the standard time zone for Myanmar (Burma), at UTC+6:30

== Biology and chemistry ==
- Biochemical Society Transactions, journal of the Biochemical Society
- Bacillus stearothermophilus, nowadays called Geobacillus stearothermophilus, a species of bacterium
- Barium strontium titanate
- Baumann Skin Types, a skin-type classification system
- Bone marrow stromal antigen, a lipid raft associated protein
- Bovine somatotropin, a type of growth hormone
- Biochemical systems theory, a mathematical modelling framework

== Computing and mathematics ==
- Browser-side templating, a templating strategy for web applications
- .bst, a filename extension for BibTeX style files
- Binary search tree, a data structure
- An axiom system inspired by ZF Set Theory

== Places ==
- Badger State Trail, bicycle trail in Wisconsin, United States
- Banks–Vernonia State Trail, a paved rail trail and state park in northwest Oregon
- Bass Strait Triangle, waters between Tasmania and mainland Australia

== Schools ==
- Brisbane School of Theology, a bible college in Toowong, Brisbane, Queensland
- British School of Tenerife, a British international school in Tenerife, Spain
- The British School in Tokyo, an international school in central Tokyo

== Transportation ==
- Bituminous surface treatment, a sealing coat for pavements
- IATA airport code of Bost Airport, an airport along the Helmand River in Afghanistan
- Station code of SHIA railway station (BST), a railway station in Tangerang, Indonesia
- Bangalore Suburban Transport, the older name for the Bangalore Metropolitan Transport Corporation
- Batik Solo Trans, a bus rapid transit in Indonesia
- Transportation Safety Board of Canada (Bureau de la sécurité des transports du Canada)
- Bombardier Sifang Transportation Ltd., a Chinese manufacturer of MUs in the railway industry
- Basti railway station (station code: BST), Uttar Pradesh, India

== Arts ==
- Bilal Satellite Television, an Islamic media production in Ethiopia
- Blood, Sweat & Tears, American jazz-rock group
- British Summer Time (concerts), an annual music festival held in Hyde Park, London
- Broom Street Theater, an experimental theater in Madison, Wisconsin

== Other ==
- Brigade spécialisée de terrain, a police unit of the Central Directorate of Public Security in France
- Basic Safety Training, training in basic firefighting, survival, safety, and first aid
- Bavarian–Austrian Salt Treaty, European treaty
