= Lipohypertrophy =

Skin lump caused by insulin injections

Lipohypertrophy is a lump under the skin caused by accumulation of extra fat at the site of many subcutaneous injections of insulin. It may be unsightly, mildly painful, and may change the timing or completeness of insulin action. It is a common, minor, chronic complication of diabetes mellitus.

Typical injection site hypertrophy is several inches or centimeters across, smoothly rounded, and somewhat firmer than ordinary subcutaneous fat. There may be some scar tissue as well, but the major component is adipose tissue, as insulin exerts a hypertrophic effect on adipose cells. To avoid lipohypertrophy, persons with diabetes mellitus who inject insulin daily for an extended period of time are advised to rotate their injections among several areas (usually upper, outer arms, outer thighs, abdomen below and around the umbilicus, and the upper parts of the buttocks). Rotation charts are often provided as part of diabetes education to help prevent lipohypertrophy.

Lipohypertrophy usually will gradually disappear over months if injections in the area are avoided.

It is a common misconception that the lump is largely scar tissue, as injection site hypertrophy is much rarer and milder with injections of other hormones and medications which lack the specific ability of insulin to stimulate adipose hypertrophy.

In a sense, the "opposite" of injection site lipohypertrophy is injection site lipoatrophy, in which the subcutaneous fat around an injected area "melts away" over a few weeks or months, leaving unsightly, well-demarcated depressions in the skin. The mechanism of this local lipoatrophy is not understood and may involve autoimmunity or local inflammation.

== See also ==
- Involutional lipoatrophy
- List of cutaneous conditions
