= Polyalkylimide =

Polymer used for plastic surgery

Polyalkylimide is a polymer whose structure contains no free monomers. It is used in permanent dermal fillers to treat soft tissue deficits such as facial lipoatrophy, gluteal atrophy, acne, and scars.

In plastic and reconstructive surgery it is used for building facial volume in the cheeks, chin, jaw, and lips. Reports of infections and migration of polyalkylimide in the face has led Canada to remove it from the market, and the manufacturer of Biolcamid ceasing production. A class action lawsuit was filed against the company.

== See also ==
- Plastic Surgery
