= Atrophic connective tissue panniculitis =

Medical condition

- Specialty: Dermatology

Atrophic connective tissue panniculitis is a rare condition, and often occurs on the upper or lower extremities.

== See also ==
- Involutional lipoatrophy
- List of cutaneous conditions
