= Acquired generalized lipodystrophy =

- Other names: Lawrence-Seip syndrome

Acquired generalized lipodystrophy (AGL), also known as Lawrence syndrome and Lawrence–Seip syndrome, is a rare skin condition that appears during childhood or adolescence, characterized by fat loss affecting large areas of the body, particularly the face, arms, and legs. There are four types of lipodystrophy based on its onset and areas affected: acquired or inherited (congenital or familial), and generalized or partial. Both acquired or inherited lipodystrophy present as loss of adipose tissues, in the absence of nutritional deprivation. The near-total loss of subcutaneous adipose tissue is termed generalized lipodystrophy while the selective loss of adipose tissues is denoted as partial lipodystrophy. Thus, as the name suggests, AGL is a near-total deficiency of adipose tissues in the body that is developed later in life. It is an extremely rare disease with only about 100 cases reported worldwide. There are three main etiologies of AGL suspected: autoimmune, panniculitis-associated, or idiopathic. After its onset, the disease progresses over a few days, weeks, months, or even in years. Clinical presentations of AGL are similar to other lipodystrophies, including metabolic complications and hypoleptinemia. Treatments are also similar and mainly supportive for symptomatic alleviation. Although HIV- or drug-induced lipodystrophy are types of acquired lipodystrophy, their origins are very specific and distinct and hence are usually not discussed with AGL (see HIV-associated lipodystrophy).

== Symptoms ==
The clinical presentation is similar to people with congenital lipodystrophy: the only difference is that AGL patients are born with normal fat distribution and symptoms develop in childhood and adolescence years and rarely begins after 30 years of age. Females are more often affected than males, with ratio being 3:1.

The hallmark characteristics are widespread loss of subcutaneous fat, ectopic fat deposition, leptin deficiency, and severe metabolic abnormalities such as insulin resistance. Subcutaneous fat loss in AGL patients are visible in all parts of the body. AGL mostly affects face and the extremities and may look sunken or swollen in the eyes. However, the degree and location of severity may vary by person. Especially, intra-abdominal fat loss is variable. As subcutaneous fat is lost, affected areas show prominent structures of veins and muscle. Those with panniculitis-associated AGL may present erythematous nodules.

Metabolic complications include insulin resistance, high metabolic rate, and uncontrolled lipid levels such as hypertriglyceridemia, low HDL, and high LDL. Patients may develop diabetes mellitus secondary to insulin resistance.

Case reports revealed that lymphoma is present in some patients but its prevalence is not known at this time.

== Cause ==
There is no known cause for this disease; however, three origins of AGL are generally suspected: panniculitis-associated, autoimmune-associated, and idiopathic AGLs. Triggers may include infections that aggravate the panniculitis, or any disease state that can induce autoimmunity. Overlap between panniculitis and autoimmune types also exists. Another theory suggest that AGL is an autoimmune disease itself, as panniculitis can be described as an autoimmune disease, however its triggering factors remains to be unknown. Underlying genetic factors may be implicated; however their existence has neither been confirmed nor rejected.

=== Panniculitis-associated AGL ===
About 25% of previously reported AGL is associated with panniculitis. Panniculitis is characterized by inflammatory nodules of the subcutaneous fat, and in this type of AGL, adipose destruction originates locally at the infection or inflammation site and develops into generalized lipodystrophy.

=== Autoimmune-associated AGL ===
AGL with autoimmune origin is responsible for about 25% of all AGL reports. Those with autoimmune origin stems from other autoimmune diseases, most commonly with juvenile dermatomyositis and autoimmune hepatitis, but also occurs with rheumatoid arthritis, systemic lupus erythematosus, and Sjogren syndrome.

=== Idiopathic AGL ===
Although idiopathic AGL accounts for about 50% of all AGL, it can vary in its origin and it is unclear how it develops.

No known preventive measurement has been reported.

== Mechanism ==
The exact pathophysiologic mechanism is mostly unknown; however, each of three main origins, autoimmune, panniculitis, or idiopathic, may have different mechanisms of pathogenesis.

Normally, adipose tissues contain adipocytes to store fat for energy during fasting period and release leptin to regulate homeostasis of energy and sensitize insulin. In AGL patients, adipose tissues are insufficient and leads to fat deposition in non-adipose tissues, such as muscle or liver, resulting in hypertriglyceridemia. Continuous elevation in triglyceride levels further contributes to metabolic problems including insulin resistance. As the level of leptin in the body is proportional to the amount of adipose tissue present, AGL patients also have a deficiency of leptin which contributes to excessive eating and worsens the metabolic syndrome.

In a few patients with AGL, the presence of antibodies against adipocyte has been identified.

== Diagnosis ==
Diagnosis is made comprehensively, together with visual observation, body fat assessment, a review of lab panels consisting of A1c, glucose, lipid, and patient history.

Caliper measurements of skinfold thickness is recommended to quantify fat loss as a supportive information. In this measurement, skinfold thickness of less than 10 millimetres (0.39 in) for men and 22 millimetres (0.87 in) for women at the anterior thigh is suggestive cutoff for the diagnosis of lipodystrophy. Less commonly, biphotonic absorptiometry and magnetic resonance imaging (MRI) can be done for the measurement of body fat.

Other forms of insulin resistance may be assessed for differential diagnosis. Resistance to conventional therapy for hyperglycemia and hypertriglyceridemia serves as an indication for lipodystrophy. Specifically, the diagnosis is strongly considered for those requiring ≥200 units/day of insulin and persistent elevation of ≥250 mg/dl of triglyceride levels.

The use of leptin levels should be carefully approached. While low leptin levels are helpful for making the diagnosis, they are not specific for the lipodystrophy. High leptin levels can help excluding the possible lipodystrophy, but there is no well-established standardized leptin ranges.

== Treatment ==
Initial and general approach for AGL patients are to treat the metabolic complications such as leptin-replacement therapy and/or to control the abnormal levels of lipids or glucose levels. Anti-diabetic medications such as insulin, metformin, or thiazolidinediones are used for insulin-resistance or high glucose levels, or statins or fibrates are used for hyperlipidemia. If symptoms persist, metreleptin can be prescribed.

Metreleptin (MYALEPT) is a recombinant human leptin analog and was approved by FDA in 2014 for generalized lipodystrophy as an adjunct therapy to diet to treat the complication of leptin deficiency. It is the only drug option approved for generalized lipodystrophy-related symptoms and is not intended to use for patients with HIV-related lipodystrophy or complications of partial lipodystrophy. Although it is a recombinant human leptin analog, it is not completely the same as natural leptin as it is produced in e. coli and has added methionine residues at is amino terminus. It works by binding to the human leptin receptor, ObR, and activates the receptor. The receptor belongs to the Class I cytokine family and signals the JAK/STAT pathway. It is available as 11.3 mg powder in a vial for subcutaneous injection upon reconstitution and needs to be protected from the light. For treatment, patients and their doctors need to be enrolled and certified in the Myalept Risk Evaluation and Mitigation Strategy (REMS) Program because people on this treatment has a risk of developing anti-metreleptin antibodies that decrease the effectiveness of metreleptin, and increased risk of lymphoma. Clinical study with GL patients who took metreleptin had increased insulin sensitivity, as indicated by decreased HbA1c and fasting glucose level, and reduced caloric intake as well as fasting triglyceride levels.

Plasmapheresis was previously an option for lowering extremely high triglyceride levels for preventing pancreatitis and painful xanthoma, but its use has been decreased after the approval of metreleptin.

Cosmetic treatments, such as facial reconstruction or implants, can be done to replace adipose tissues.

Lifestyle modifications are also recommended, including changes into less fat diet and exercise.

The prognosis of the disease is unknown as of December 2017.

== Research ==
Much research for the treatment of lipodystrophy focuses on the safety and efficacy of leptin replacement therapy and the outlook is positive in many studies.

According to a prospective, open-label clinical study at the NIH, metreleptin decreased the fasting glucose level from 180 mg/dL to 121 mg/dL, HbA1c from 8.4% to 6.4%, total cholesterol from 214 mg/dL to 146 mg/dL, and triglycerides from 467 (200-847)mg/dL to 180 (106-312)mg/dL after 12 months of use (p<0.001). Patients also had decreased use of anti-diabetic medications, lipid-lowering medications, and insulin (p<0.001). In other clinical reports studying 3 patients diagnosed with AGL accompanied by hypoleptinemia, uncontrolled diabetes, and hypertriglyceridemia who were treated with metreleptin for 12–168 weeks, patients had great reduction in HbA1c, from 10.9% to 5.8%, and had normalized serum triglycerides with a mean decline of 90%. Patients reported improved quality of life and reduced need for other medications without significant adverse effects.

One research published in 2017 reported a middle-aged patient developed AGL after treatment and recovery for autoimmune thrombocytopenia that included immunoglobulin therapy and prednisone, which suggests the autoimmune trigger may contribute to the development of AGL.

Other researches focus on genetics of lipodystrophy; however its relevance to acquired generalized lipodystrophy has not been confirmed so far. One clinical report published in July 2017 stated two brothers with juvenile-onset generalized lipodystrophy was due to lamin C-specific mutation but it is unknown at this point if this will fall into acquired or familial lipodystrophy.

There have been many published case reports. Meta-analysis of published case reports published within the decade will be very helpful in establishing patient demographic, etiologies, and prognosis of the diagnosis.

== See also ==
- Lipodystrophy
- List of cutaneous conditions
- HIV-associated lipodystrophy
