= Non-progressive late-onset linear hemifacial lipoatrophy =

- Specialty: Dermatology

Non-progressive late-onset linear hemifacial lipoatrophy is a cutaneous condition that occurs on the malar cheek, mostly in the elderly population.

== See also ==
- Drug-induced lipodystrophy
- List of cutaneous conditions
