= Injector pen =

Drug storage and delivery device

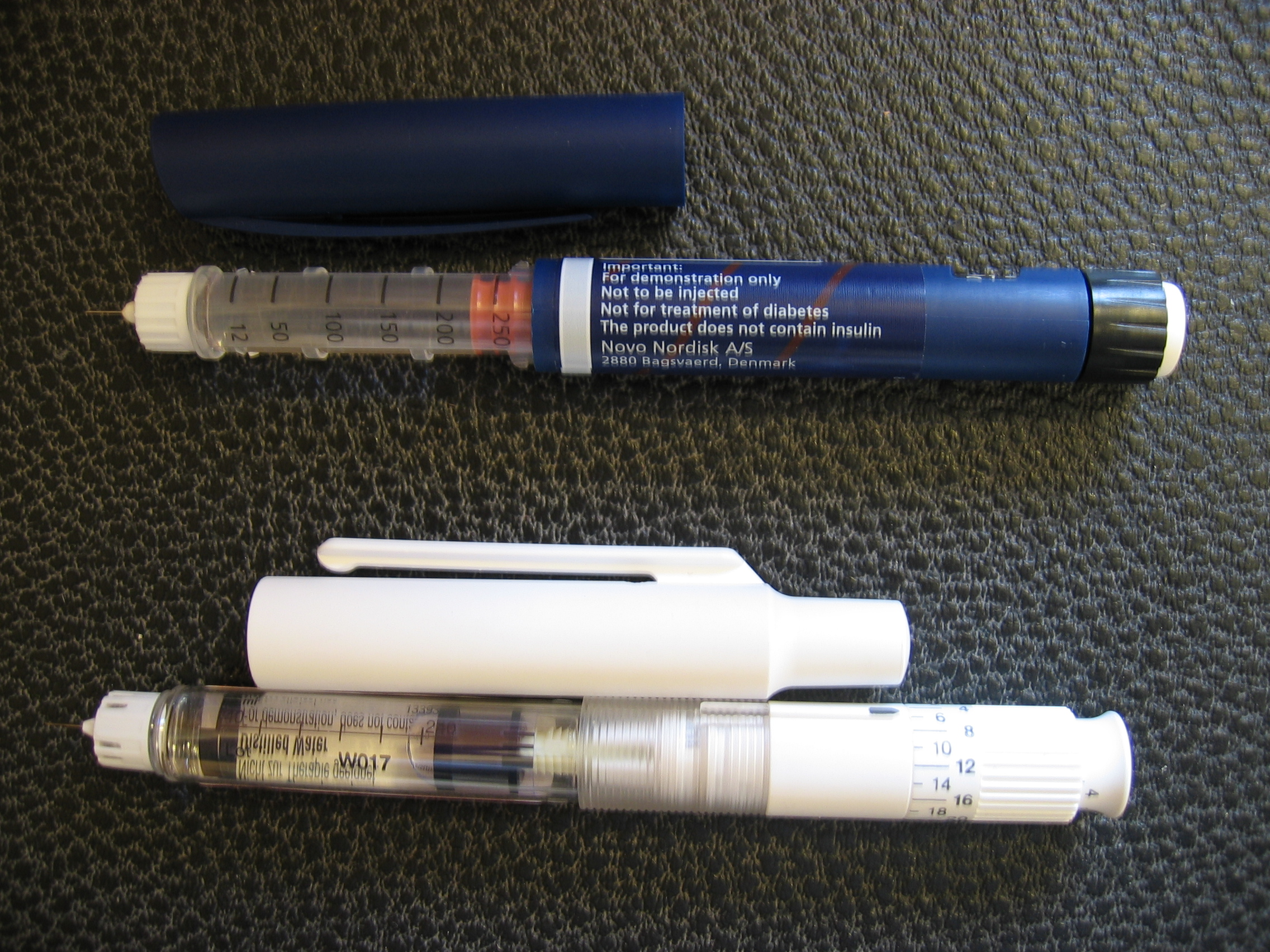
Two disposable injector pens. On the top pen there is a disclaimer that it contains no insulin and is not to be used for treatment of diabetes.

An injector pen (also called a medication pen) is a device used for injecting medication under the skin. First introduced in the 1980s, injector pens are designed to make injectable medication easier and more convenient to use, thus increasing patient adherence. The primary difference between injector pens and traditional vial and syringe administration is the easier use of an injector pen by people with low dexterity, poor vision, or who need portability to administer medicine on time. Injector pens also decrease the fear or adversity towards self-injection of medications, which increases the likelihood that a person takes the medication.

Injector pens are commonly used for medications that are injected repeatedly by a person over a relatively short period of time, especially insulin and insulin analogs used in the treatment of diabetes (called insulin pens). Many other medications are also available as injector pens, including other injectable medicines for diabetes, high cholesterol, migraine prevention, and other monoclonal antibodies. Studies have shown injector pens to be at least as effective as vial and syringe administration, and surveys have shown that a vast majority of people would prefer an injector pen over vial and syringe administration if one was available. After a slow uptake in the United States, injector pens have surpassed vial and syringe administration of insulin in type 2 diabetes.

== Uses ==
The primary goal of injector pens is to increase patient adherence by making it easier and more convenient for people to use injectable therapy. This is especially problematic with injectable medications given the extra work associated with an injection, as well as the potential aversion to self-injecting medication.

Injector pens increase patient adherence by increasing the ease of self-administering injectable medication, as well as the portability of injection medication. Furthermore, injector pens are easier to handle and use than vials and syringes, making them useful in people with low dexterity, cognitive or visual impairment, or those who worry about being able to properly use a vial and syringe. For medications which do not follow standard dosage in all people, injector pens may be designed to enable easier and more accurate administration of an exact dose, whereas a vial and syringe requires the person to prepare the correct dose themselves. Injector pens may also remove stigma or fear around the use of injection medication in public environments, such as insulin before a meal at a restaurant.

Combination injector pens which include multiple medications used to treat a disease are designed to reduce the number of injections a person must use to administer their medications. The reduction in number of injections required may decrease the risk of non-adherence due to forgetfulness or unwillingness to self-inject medication.

== Design ==
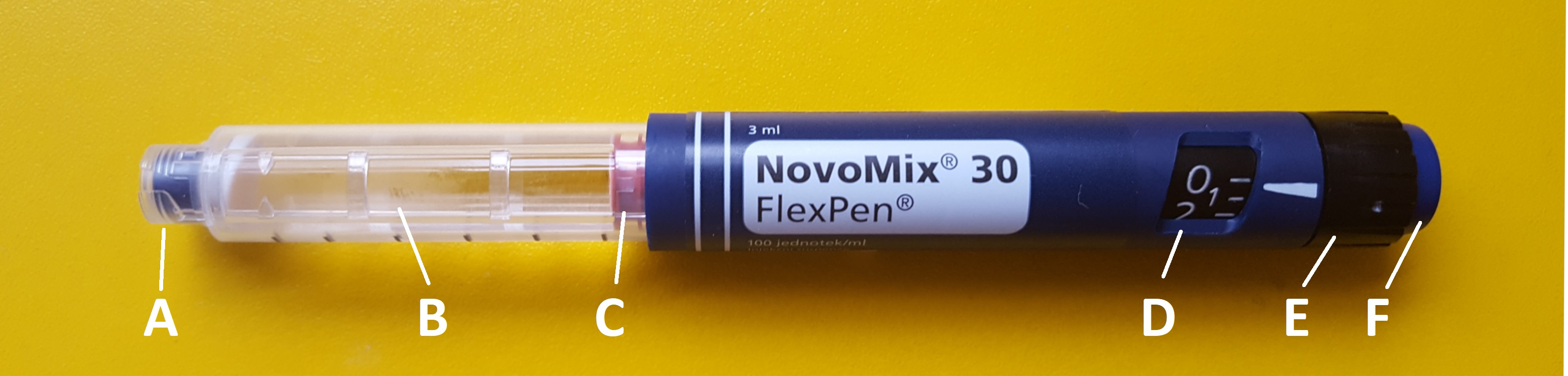
An insulin pen with labels as follows: A) tip; B) medication chamber; C) plunger; D) dose window; E) dose selection dial; F) plunger button

Example of a reusable injector pen used for insulin

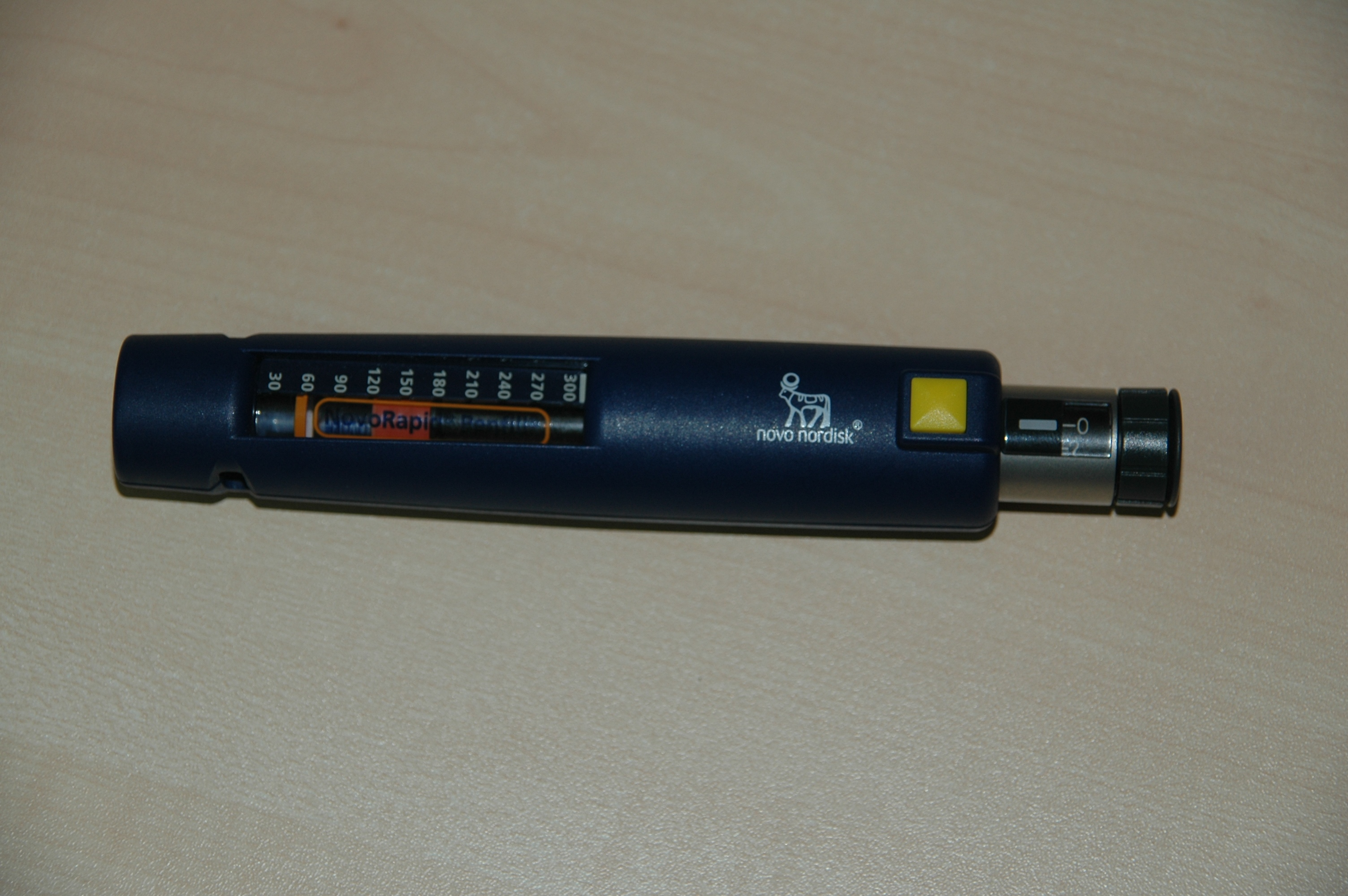
A reusable insulin pen assembled.

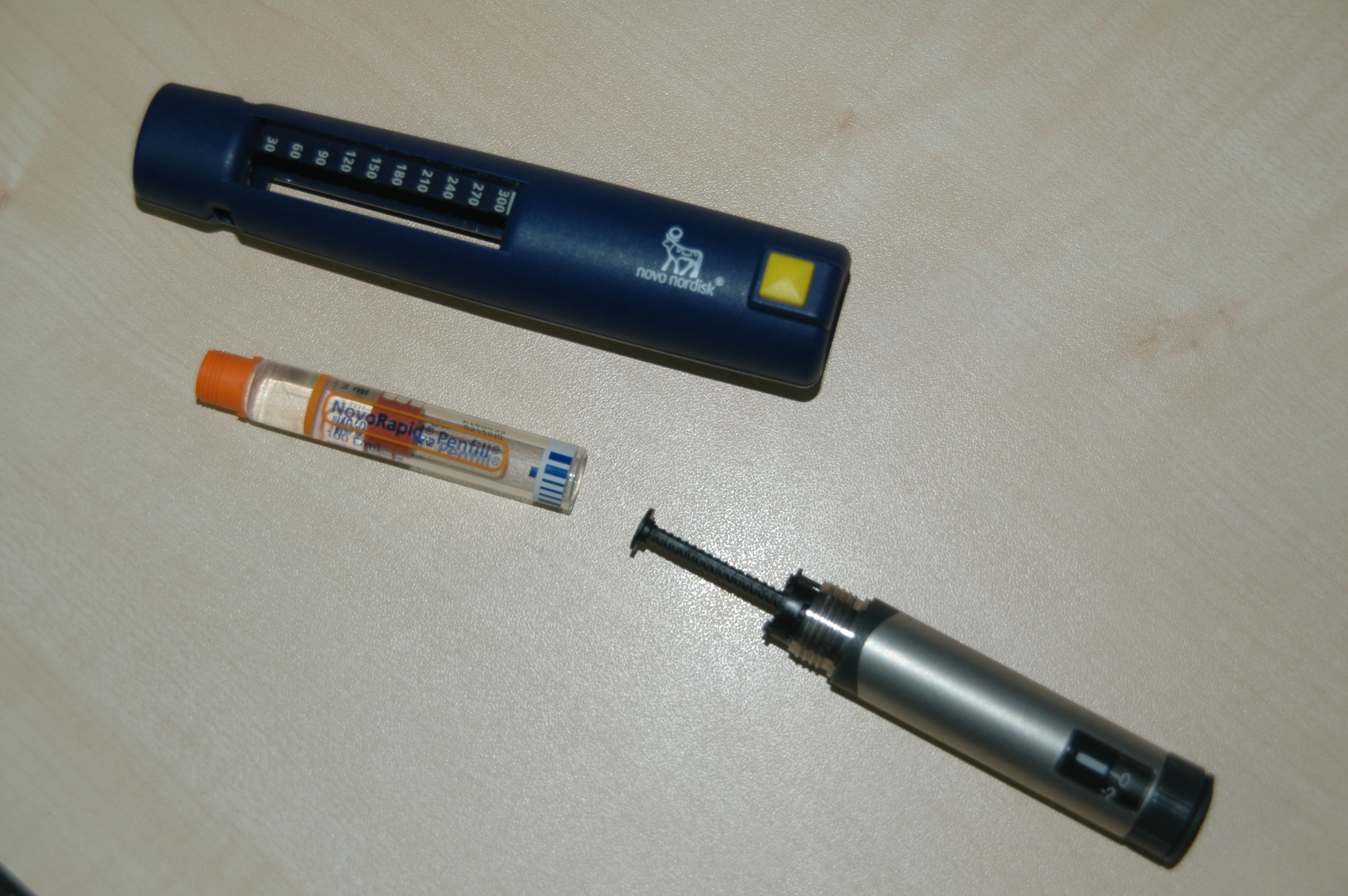
The same insulin pen disassembled, showing replaceable cartridge and reusable housing pieces.

An injector pen consists of a chamber or cartridge of medication, a tip to attach a needle, and a piston or plunger to inject the dose. Some pens, including most insulin pens, include dials to adjust the dose of the injection before each administration. Dials enable more accurate dose measuring than traditional vial and syringe administration, especially for low doses of insulin. Injector pens which have dials to adjust dosages may also include a clicking sound or other method to confirm the dose adjustment.

Some pens may include a cartridge filled with medication which can be replaced when empty to enable reuse of the pen itself, whereas other pens are designed to be disposed of after their prefilled chamber is depleted. Injector pens designed for single use may also be autoinjectors, which do not require the user to press a plunger to inject the dose.

=== Pen needles ===
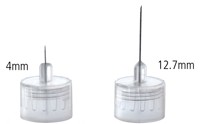
Comparison of 4mm and 12.7mm pen needle sizes

All injector pens other than those designed for single use require the use of single-use replaceable pen needles for each injection. These pen needles come in various lengths to accommodate varying depths of subcutaneous tissue under the top of the skin. Pen needles are designed for single use subcutaneous injection of medication and are not designed to be reused for more than one administration. The needles are generally manufactured with an outer protective plastic shell, which is used by a person to attach the needle to the pen, and an inner plastic shell protecting the needle itself. Instruction on how to properly attach and use needles is the responsibility of the doctor or pharmacist to ensure proper use.

Today, pen needles are manufactured at shorter needle lengths than required for typical vial and syringe administration, which decreases the pain associated with injection. They are available in multiple lengths and gauge of needle, including 3.5mm, 4mm, 5mm, and 8mm lengths, and 31 through 34 gauge. Over time, needles have also had bevels designed which decrease the force required to penetrate the skin, which decreases the pain associated with injection and may increase the acceptability of self-injection. Furthermore, pen needles are designed for insertion at a 90-degree angle to the skin, as opposed to normal syringes which are designed to be injected at an angle. Pen needles generally do not require pinching of the skin for proper administration, unlike historically used syringes. Pen needles should be disposed of properly after each use, preferably in a purpose-made sharps container, to prevent injury from accidental contact after use.

=== Comparison to syringe ===
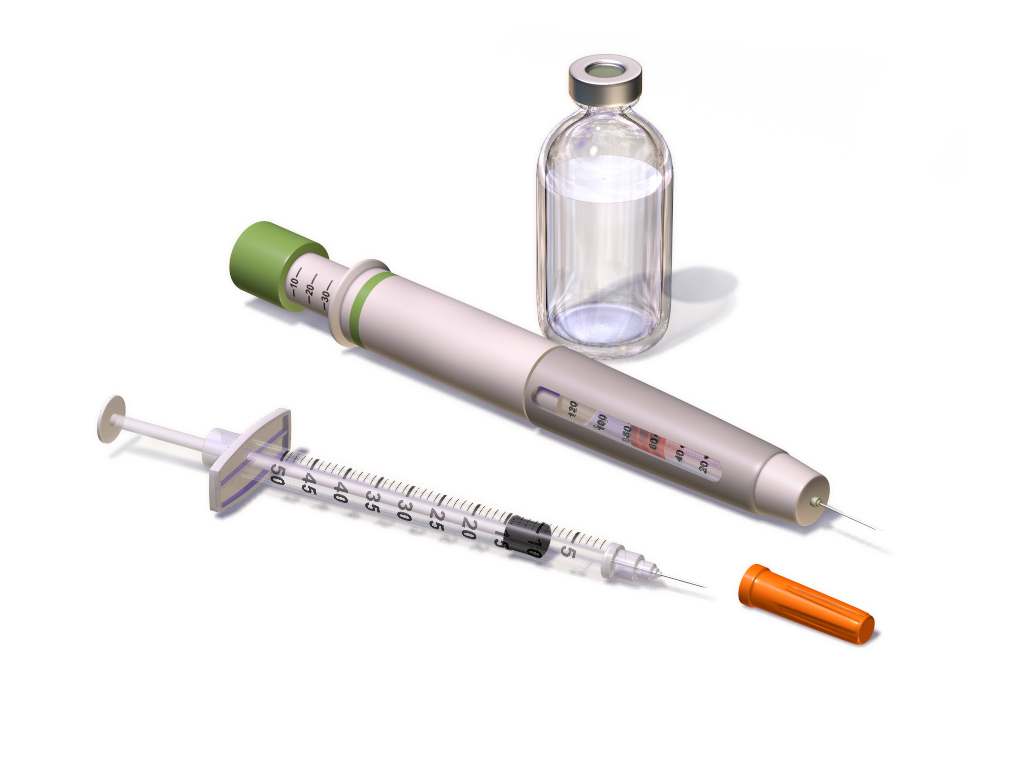
A standard insulin syringe with needle is smaller than an injector pen.

Injector pens are an alternative to the manufacture of medication for injection in vials containing either liquid or a powder to which a diluent such as sterile water is added. When a vial is used as a means of storage, the end-user must use a syringe to "draw up" or remove the medication from the vial to prepare it for administration. The end user must then perform a series of actions to insert the needle of the syringe under the skin, and depress the plunger on the syringe to inject the dose. This requires dexterity which may make it difficult to accurately or completely administer the appropriate doses of medications. Injector pens remove some of the complications of syringes by allowing the pen to be "pushed" against the skin at a 90-degree angle (removing the need to inject at a proper angle as is the case with syringes), as well as by replacing a long, thin plunger of a syringe with a simple button which is depressed and held to inject the dose.

== Availability ==
Many insulin analogs and GLP-1 agonists for diabetes treatment are available as injector pens. As with insulin vials, some insulin pens are made with higher concentrations including U-200, U-300, and U-500. Different concentration insulin products may not have the same pharmacokinetic properties as other strengths. The higher concentrations are used to lessen the volume of the injection, and allow the same dose of insulin to be injected with less force. In some cases, these medications may be combined into one pen to be administered daily, for example insulin degludec with liraglutide and insulin glargine with lixisenatide. Combination products are available in fixed-dose ratios and are generally dosed by units of insulin, which will administer a proportional amount of the GLP-1 agonist as well.

Another class of medication commonly available as an injector pen is monoclonal antibodies. Due to the molecular size of monoclonal antibodies, they must be administered via injection. Examples of monoclonal antibodies available or studied as injector pens include adalimumab, secukinumab, and alirocumab. CGRP antagonists which are monoclonal antibodies, used for the prevention of migraines, are also available as injector pens. Other monoclonal antibodies designed for home use may also be manufactured as injector pens.

Some medications are formulated as injector pens to quicken the onset of action of the medication. This includes epinephrine, which when used to treat anaphylaxis must work as soon as possible. Contrary to most other injector pens, epinephrine injector pens are designed to administer the medication via intramuscular injection. Another medication formulated as an injector pen to ensure quick onset of action is glucagon for hypoglycemia. Other medications normally administered orally are also available or have been studied as injector pens, either due to different pharmacokinetic properties when administered via injection, or for those who cannot take oral medications. This includes methotrexate for juvenile idiopathic arthritis and sumatriptan for treatment of migraines.

== Effectiveness ==
Most injector pens are designed for subcutaneous injection just under the skin, but some are designed for injection into muscle. The desired injection site and the skin profile at the injection site will determine what needle length is appropriate for a person to use. For products with included needles, such as epinephrine pens, different brands may have different included needle lengths, which must be taken into account.

Multiple studies have shown that many people prefer the use of injector pens over other forms of injectable medication, such as vial and syringe. Injector pens in general have also been shown to be at least as effective therapeutically as other injection methods. One study of the use of injector pens for insulin administration found that the chance a person initiated on insulin continued therapy for at least 12 months was higher with insulin pens than with vial and syringe administration. The same study found that the increase in adherence to therapy resulted in increased short-term pharmacy costs (i.e. for the pens/needles) but resulted in an overall decrease in healthcare costs related to diabetes. Insulin pens have also been shown to provide a higher quality of life than traditional injection methods. A 2011 systematic review which examined preference of insulin pens over vial and syringe administration found that in almost all studies and surveys a majority of people preferred insulin pens.

The effectiveness of an injector pen can also depend on the technique used to inject. After fully pressing the plunger button to activate the pen, the button must continue to be held for about 10 seconds to ensure the dose is administered before removing the pen needle from the skin and finally releasing the button. Failure to use the pen as instructed may result in medication leakage and administration of a lower dose than was intended. Another administration problem which may impact effectiveness of an injector pen is lipohypertrophy of the subcutaneous tissue near the injection site. For this reason, it is recommended to rotate the injection site every administration.

== History ==
The first injector pen, branded "Penject", was introduced in 1983 to administer insulin products, following trials begun in 1981 at Southern General Hospital, Scotland, initiated by Sheila Reith who has conceived the device, and funded by Diabetes UK. The invention was announced, and the preliminary trial described, in a January 1981 paper in The Lancet. The patent rights were later sold to Novo Nordisk by Greater Glasgow Health Board.

After their introduction, insulin pens had a slow adoption in the United States, with only 2% of insulin being injected via pen in 1999. A major barrier to adoption in the United States was the increased up-front cost of insulin pens compared to traditional injections. Pen adoption in the United States accelerated after studies showed that the higher up-front cost of insulin pens was offset by the increase in compliance, which decreased overall healthcare costs. Historically, pen needles were manufactured in lengths up to 12.7mm. Over time, pen needles designed for insulin pens have become shorter, and a 4mm long needle is considered sufficient for most people to administer subcutaneously correctly.

In 1989, an injector pen form of human growth hormone was licensed in New Zealand.
