= Subcutaneous administration =

Insertion of medication under the skin

Subcutaneous administration is the insertion of medications beneath the skin either by injection or infusion.

A subcutaneous injection is administered as a bolus into the subcutis, the layer of skin directly below the dermis and epidermis, collectively referred to as the cutis. The instruments are usually a hypodermic needle and a syringe. Subcutaneous injections are highly effective in administering medications such as insulin, morphine, diacetylmorphine and goserelin. Subcutaneous administration may be abbreviated as SC, SQ, subcu, sub-Q, SubQ, SUBQ, or subcut. SUBQ is the preferred abbreviation to reduce the risk of misunderstanding and potential errors.

Subcutaneous tissue has few blood vessels and so drugs injected into it are intended for slow, sustained rates of absorption, often with some amount of depot effect. Compared with other routes of administration, it is slower than intramuscular injections but still faster than intradermal injections. Subcutaneous infusion (as opposed to subcutaneous injection) is similar but involves a continuous drip from a bag and line, as opposed to injection with a syringe.

== Medical uses ==
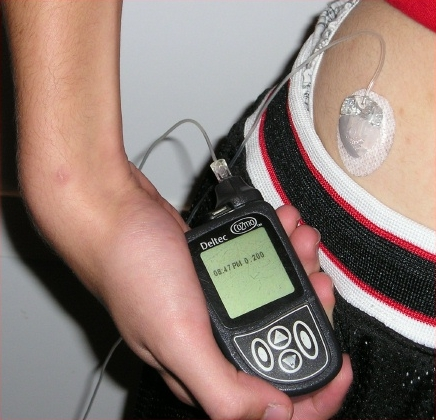
An insulin pump with a subcutaneous infusion site

A subcutaneous injection is administered into the fatty tissue of the subcutaneous tissue, located below the dermis and epidermis. They are commonly used to administer medications, especially those which cannot be administered by mouth as they would not be absorbed from the gastrointestinal tract. A subcutaneous injection is absorbed slower than a substance injected intravenously or into a muscle, but faster than a medication administered by mouth.

=== Medications ===
Medications commonly administered via subcutaneous injection or infusion include insulin, live vaccines, monoclonal antibodies, and heparin. These medications cannot be administered orally as the molecules are too large to be absorbed in the intestines. Subcutaneous injections can also be used when the increased bioavailability and more rapid effects over oral administration are preferred. They are also the easiest form of parenteral administration of medication to perform by lay people, and are associated with less adverse effects such as pain or infection than other forms of injection.

==== Insulin ====
Perhaps the most common medication administered subcutaneously is insulin. While attempts have been made since the 1920s to administer insulin orally, the large size of the molecule has made it difficult to create a formulation with absorption and predictability that comes close to subcutaneous injections of insulin. People with type 1 diabetes almost all require insulin as part of their treatment regimens, and a smaller proportion of people with type 2 diabetes do as well — with tens of millions of prescriptions per year in the United States alone.

Insulin historically was injected from a vial using a syringe and needle, but may also be administered subcutaneously using devices such as injector pens or insulin pumps. An insulin pump consists of a catheter which is inserted into the subcutaneous tissue, and then secured in place to allow insulin to be administered multiple times through the same injection site.

==== Antibiotics ====
In addition to established uses such as insulin administration, the subcutaneous route has increasingly been investigated for the delivery of selected antibiotics as an alternative to intravenous therapy in specific clinical contexts. Available pharmacokinetic and clinical evidence indicates that several time-dependent agents, including β-lactams (e.g. ceftriaxone) and glycopeptides (e.g. teicoplanin), can achieve systemic exposures comparable to intravenous administration while avoiding the need for venous access. This strategy may be particularly relevant for patients with difficult venous access, within outpatient parenteral antimicrobial therapy programs, and in palliative care settings; however, its use remains largely off-label and is supported primarily by observational studies and pharmacokinetic data.

=== Recreational drug use ===
Subcutaneous injection may also be used by people to (self-) administer recreational drugs. This can be referred to as skin popping. In some cases, the administration of illicit drugs in this way is associated with unsafe practices leading to infections and other adverse effects. In rare cases, this results in serious side effects such as AA amyloidosis. Recreational drugs reported to be administered subcutaneously have included cocaine, mephedrone, and amphetamine derivatives such as PMMA.

== Contraindications ==
Contraindications to subcutaneous injections primarily depend on the specific medication being administered. Doses which would require more than 2 mL to be injected at once are not administered subcutaneously. Medications which may cause necrosis or otherwise be damaging or irritating to tissues should also not be administered subcutaneously. An injection should not be given at a specific site if there is inflammation or skin damage in the area.

== Risks and complications ==
With normal doses of medicine (less than 2 mL in volume), complications or adverse effects are very rare. The most common adverse reactions after subcutaneous injections are administered are termed "injection site reactions". This term encompasses any combination of redness, swelling, itching, bruising, or other irritation that does not spread beyond the immediate vicinity of the injection. Injection site reactions may be minimized if repeated injections are necessary by moving the injection site at least one inch from previous injections, or using a different injection location altogether. There may also be specific complications associated with the specific medication being administered.

=== Medication-specific ===
Due to the frequency of injections required for the administration of insulin products via subcutaneous injection, insulin is associated with the development of lipohypertrophy and lipoatrophy. This can lead to slower or incomplete absorption from the injection site. Rotating the injection site is the primary method of preventing changes in tissue structure from insulin administration. Heparin-based anticoagulants injected subcutaneously may cause hematoma and bruising around the injection site due to their anticoagulant effect. This includes heparin and low molecular weight heparin products such as enoxaparin. There is some low certainty evidence that administering the injection more slowly may decrease the pain from heparin injections, but not the risk of or extent of bruising. Subcutaneous heparin-based anticoagulation may also lead to necrosis of the surrounding skin or lesions, most commonly when injected in the abdomen.

Many medications have the potential to cause local lesions or swelling due to the irritating effect the medications have on the skin and subcutaneous tissues. This includes medications such as apomorphine and hyaluronic acid injected as a filler, which may cause the area to appear bruised. Hyaluronic acid "bruising" may be treated using injections of hyaluronidase enzyme around the location.

Other common medication-specific side effects include pain, burning or stinging, warmth, rash, flushing, or multiple of these reactions at the injection site, collectively termed "injection site reactions". This is seen with the subcutaneous injection of triptans for migraine headache, medroxyprogesterone acetate for contraception, as well as many monoclonal antibodies. In most cases, injection site reactions are self-limiting and resolve on their own after a short time without treatment, and do not require the medication to be discontinued.

The administration of vaccines subcutaneously is also associated with injection site reactions. This includes the BCG vaccine which is associated with a specific scar appearance which can be used as evidence of prior vaccination. Other subcutaneous vaccines, many of which are live vaccines including the MMR vaccine and the varicella vaccine, which may cause fever and rash, as well as a feeling of general malaise for a day or two following the vaccination.

== Technique ==
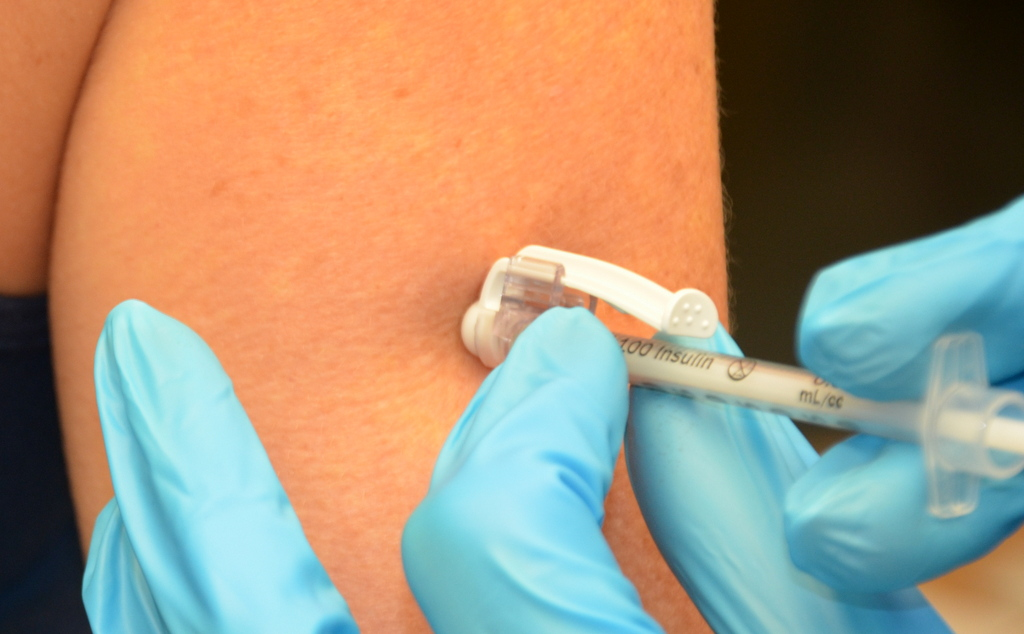
Subcutaneous injection with insulin syringe at 90 degrees.

Subcutaneous injections are performed by cleaning the area to be injected followed by an injection, usually at a 45-degree angle to the skin when using a syringe and needle or at a 90-degree angle (perpendicular) if using an injector pen. The appropriate injection angle is based on the length of needle used, and the depth of the subcutaneous fat in the skin of the specific person. A 90-degree angle is typically used for medications such as heparin and insulin. If administered at an angle, the skin and underlying tissue may be pinched upwards prior to injection. The injection is administered slowly, lasting about 10 seconds per milliliter of fluid injected, and the needle may be left in place for 10 seconds following injection to ensure the medicine is fully injected.

=== Equipment ===
The gauge of the needle used can range from 25 gauge to 27 gauge, while the length can vary between 1/2-inch to 5/8-inch for injections using a syringe and needle. For subcutaneous injections delivered using devices such as injector pens, the needle used may be as thin as 34 gauge (commonly 30–32 gauge), and as short as 3.5 mm (commonly 3.5 mm to 5 mm). Subcutaneous injections can also be delivered via a pump system which uses a cannula inserted under the skin. The specific needle size/length, as well as appropriateness of a device such as a pen or pump, is based on the characteristics of a person's skin layers.

=== Locations ===
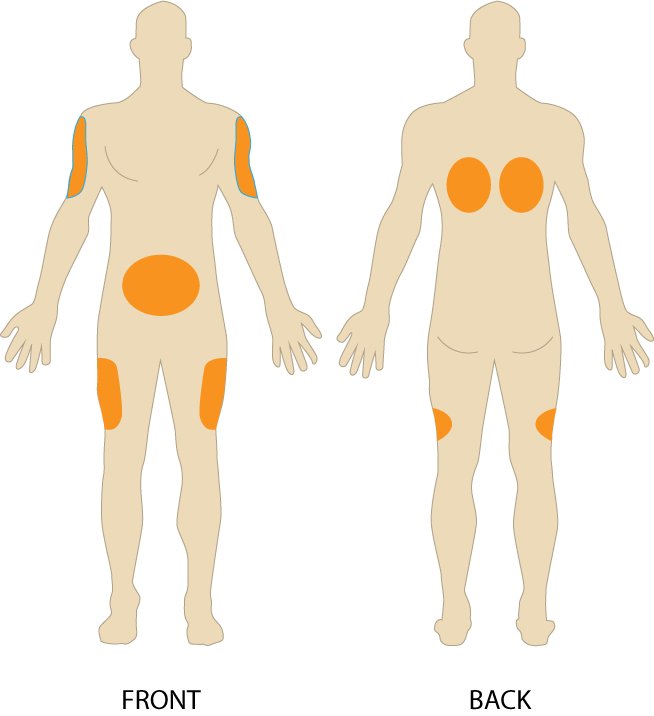
Subcutaneous injection sites

Commonly used injection sites include:

- The outer area of the upper arm.
- The abdomen, avoiding a 2-inch circle around the navel.
- The front of the thigh, between 4 inches from the top of the thigh and 4 inches above the knee.
- The upper back.
- The upper area of the buttock, just behind the hip bone.

The choice of specific injection site is based on the medication being administered, with heparin almost always being administered in the abdomen, as well as preference. Injections administered frequently or repeatedly should be administered in a different location each time, either within the same general site or a different site, but at least one inch away from recent injections.

=== Self-administration ===
As opposed to intramuscular or intravenous injections, subcutaneous injections can be easily performed by people with minor skill and training required. The injection sites for self-injection of medication are the same as for injection by a healthcare professional, and the skill can be taught to patients using pictures, videos, or models of the subcutaneous tissue for practice. People who are to self-inject medicine subcutaneously should be trained how to evaluate and rotate the injection site if complications or contraindications arise. Self-administration by subcutaneous injection generally does not require disinfection of the skin outside of a hospital setting as the risk of infection is extremely low, but instead it is recommended to ensure that the site and person's hands are simply clean prior to administration.

=== Infusion ===
Subcutaneous infusion, also known as interstitial infusion or hypodermoclysis, is a form of subcutaneous (under the skin) administration of fluids to the body, often saline or glucose solutions. It is the infusion counterpart of subcutaneous injection with a syringe.

Subcutaneous infusion can be used where a slow rate of fluid uptake is required compared to intravenous infusion. Typically, it is limited to 1 mL per minute, although it is possible to increase this by using two sites simultaneously. The chief advantages of subcutaneous infusion over intravenous infusion is that it is cheap and can be administered by non-medical personnel with minimal supervision. It is therefore particularly suitable for home care. The enzyme hyaluronidase can be added to the fluid to improve absorption during the infusion.

Subcutaneous infusion can be speeded up by applying it to multiple sites simultaneously. The technique was pioneered by Evan O'Neill Kane in 1900. Kane was looking for a technique that was as fast as intravenous infusion but not so risky to use on trauma patients in unhygienic conditions in the field.

== In veterinary medicine ==
Subcutaneous injection is a common way to replace fluids in cats for mild dehydration.

== See also ==
- Intramuscular injection
- Intravenous injection
- Intradermal injection
