= Ivo Pitanguy =

Brazilian plastic surgeon (1926–2016)

- Born: Ivo Hélcio Jardim de Campos Pitanguy; July 5, 1926; Belo Horizonte, Minas Gerais, Brazil
- Died: August 6, 2016 (aged 90); Rio de Janeiro, Brazil
- Education: Federal University of Minas Gerais
- Occupation: Plastic surgeon
- Known for: Contributions to aesthetic and reconstructive surgery
- Spouse: Marilu Pitanguy
- Children: 4

Ivo Hélcio Jardim de Campos Pitanguy (July 5, 1926 – August 6, 2016) was a Brazilian plastic surgeon who made significant contributions to the fields of cosmetic and reconstructive surgery. Based in Rio de Janeiro, Pitanguy came to prominence for treating hundreds of victims of the 1961 Niterói circus fire. He pursued a philosophical approach to plastic surgery, emphasizing its role in improving patients' self-esteem and quality of life. Pitanguy trained thousands of surgeons, which led to the spread of his techniques globally. He is thought to be the creator of the Brazilian butt lift.

== Early life and education ==
Pitanguy was born on July 5, 1926 in Belo Horizonte, Minas Gerais. His father, Antônio de Campos Pitanguy, was a general practitioner, and his mother was Estael Jardim de Campos Pitanguy. Pitanguy pursued his medical degree at the Federal University of Minas Gerais. Then he continued his training at TriHealth Bethesda North Hospital in Montgomery, Ohio, where he worked under the guidance of surgeon John Longacre. Seeking further specialization, Pitanguy traveled to Europe, where he trained in plastic surgery in France and England. In Paris, he worked with several notable surgeons, including Marc Iselin at the Foch Hospital, and later furthered his training at the Mayo Clinic in the United States.

== Professional career ==
Upon returning to Brazil in 1953, Pitanguy began his career at a public hospital, where he quickly established himself as a leading plastic surgeon. His career took a turn on December 17, 1961, when a major fire engulfed a circus tent in Niterói, trapping thousands of spectators inside. The incident killed 503 people and left over 800 survivors with severe burns. Pitanguy, along with his team, treated hundreds of burn victims in the weeks that followed. This experience profoundly impacted him, reinforcing his belief that physical appearance plays a crucial role in psychological well-being and social acceptance.

In the aftermath of the incident, Pitanguy became increasingly committed to making plastic surgery accessible to poorer Brazilians. He founded a private clinic, Clínica Ivo Pitanguy, in the Botafogo neighborhood of Rio de Janeiro. The clinic, which included educational facilities such as an auditorium and a library for lectures and research, attracted plastic surgeons from around the world to study Pitanguy's techniques there. In addition to his career as a plastic surgeon, he also worked at the Santa Casa da Misericórdia Hospital, a public hospital in Rio de Janeiro. There, Pitanguy paid for the renovation of a ward and provided free surgical treatment to patients for over four decades. He also organized and led several international symposia and congresses on plastic surgery.

== Writings and death ==
In addition to his medical career, Pitanguy was also a member of both the Brazilian Academy of Letters and the National Academy of Medicine. As a writer, he wrote several works on plastic surgery, the human condition, and the interplay between beauty, identity, and self-esteem. He was particularly interested in the psychological impact of physical appearance on individuals and society, a theme he explored in his lectures and publications. Pitanguy died on August 6, 2016, one day after he carried the Olympic flame in a wheelchair in Rio de Janeiro during the 2016 Summer Olympics.

== Published works ==
Some of Pitanguy's notable works include:

- A Arte de Viver (1995) – In this book, Pitanguy reflects on the art of living, touching upon the connection between physical appearance and psychological well-being.
- Plastic Surgery of the Head and Body (1981) – A comprehensive guide to plastic surgery techniques, which became a reference in the field.
- Cem Frases Que Me Tocaram (2000) – A collection of quotes that influenced Pitanguy's philosophy on life and surgery.
