= Centrifugal lipodystrophy =

- Other names: Centrifugal abdominal lipodystrophy, Lipodystrophia centrifugalis abdominalis infantalis
- Specialty: Dermatology

Centrifugal lipodystrophy is a skin condition characterized by areas of subcutaneous fat loss that slowly enlarge.

== See also ==
- Lipodystrophy
- List of cutaneous conditions
- Skin lesion
