= Leslie Baumann =

American dermatologist, author, and researcher

- Born: Lubbock, Texas, U.S.
- Education: University of Texas; Baylor College of Medicine; University of Miami
- Known for: Skin Type Solutions
- Medical career
- Profession: Physician, CEO Baumann Cosmetic and Research Institute
- Field: Dermatology
- Institutions: University of Miami School of Medicine
- Sub-specialties: Skin types
- Website: lesliebaumannmd.com

Leslie Baumann is an American dermatologist, author, and researcher based in Miami, Florida. She founded the Cosmetic Dermatology Center at the University of Miami in 1997 and is the founder and CEO of the Baumann Cosmetic and Research Institute.

Baumann has authored several dermatology textbooks and with The New York Times bestseller, The Skin Type Solution. She is also the author of a regular columns for the Miami Herald, Dermatology News and Yahoo! Health.

== Early life and education ==
Baumann was born and raised in Lubbock, Texas. She attended the University of Texas for her undergraduate studies, and later graduated from Baylor College of Medicine. Baumann completed her residency at the University of Miami’s Miller School of Medicine.

== Career ==
In 1997, Baumann founded the University of Miami Cosmetic Center, the first university-operated center dedicated to cosmetic dermatology in the United States. She worked as a professor at the university, as well as director of the Cosmetic Center for 13 years. In 2007, she founded the Baumann Cosmetic & Research Institute (BCRI), an 8,500 square-foot facility in Miami. She has led research studies for the US Food and Drug Administration (FDA) to investigate cosmetic procedures such as the use of Myobloc (Botulinum toxin) for treating frown lines, and botox and Myobloc for treating excessive sweating of the palms and underarms. She has also participated in over 20 clinical trials for skin aging, body contouring or facial rejuvenation products including Juvéderm, Sculptra and others.

In 2002, Baumann published Cosmetic Dermatology: Principles and Practice The second edition of Cosmetic Dermatology: Principles and Practice was released in 2009. In 2014, Baumann published Cosmeceuticals and Cosmetic Ingredients.

=== Skin Type Solution ===
Baumann authored The New York Times best-seller The Skin Type Solution in 2005. The book is based on Baumann's research on cosmeceutical ingredients and individual skin types. In 2014, Baumann started the 'Skin Type Solution Franchise System', a retail distribution network based on the research from her book, The Skin Type Solution, and the questionnaire, known as the 'Baumann Skin Type Indicator' (BSTI).

== Bibliography ==
- Cosmetic Dermatology: Principles and Practice (McGraw Hill, 2002) ISBN 9780071362818
- The Skin Type Solution (Bantam, 2006) ISBN 9780553804225
- Cosmetic Dermatology: Principles and Practice Second edition (McGraw Hill, 2009) ISBN 9780071793995
- Cosmeceuticals and Cosmetic Ingredients (McGraw Hill, 2014) ISBN 9780071793988
