= Southern General Hospital =

Former hospital in Glasgow, Scotland

- NHS Greater Glasgow and Clyde
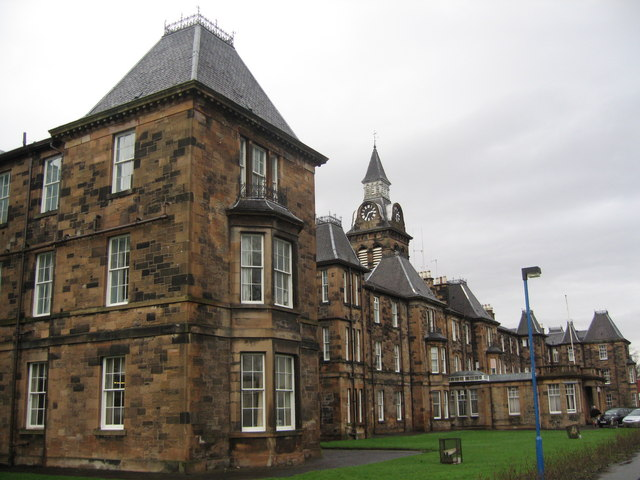
- Central Medical Block at the Southern General Hospital

- Shown in Glasgow

Geography
- Location: Linthouse, Glasgow, Scotland
- Coordinates: 55°51′45″N 4°20′26″W

Organisation
- Care system: NHS Scotland
- Type: Teaching
- Affiliated university: University of Glasgow Glasgow Caledonian University

Services
- Emergency department: Yes
- Beds: 900
- Speciality: Neuroscience; Spinal cord injury

History
- Founded: 1872
- Closed: 2015

Links
- Lists: Hospitals in Scotland

The Southern General Hospital was a large teaching hospital in the Linthouse area of Glasgow, Scotland. It had an acute operational bed complement of approximately 900. In 2015 its facilities and services were succeeded by the newly completed Queen Elizabeth University Hospital, which was constructed on the site of the old hospital.

== History ==
The hospital had its origins in the Govan Combination Poorhouse, which was located in old cavalry barracks on Eglinton Street in 1852. A new 240-bed hospital and 180-patient lunatic asylum were designed by James Thomson and completed in 1872. A major extension involving 700 more beds was completed in 1905. The hospital was formally renamed the Southern General Hospital in 1923 and it joined the National Health Service in 1948.

Upgrading of the hospital's facilities began during the 1950s and culminated in the opening of a new maternity unit in 1970 and the completion of the Institute of Neurological Sciences in 1972, where the Glasgow Coma Scale was devised by Graham Teasdale and Bryan Jennett in 1974.

While working for the hospital in the 1970s, Sheila Reith conceived the insulin pen, and developed it there with two colleagues. It was introduced for general use in 1983.

The Langlands Building, which provides care for the elderly, was procured under a private finance initiative contract in 1999, built by Carillion and opened in 2001. The laboratory, established to process results from hospitals across Scotland, cost £90 million and opened in 2012.

All its services were transferred to the newly completed Queen Elizabeth University Hospital in 2015.
