= Localized lipodystrophy =

- Specialty: Dermatology

Localized lipodystrophy is a skin condition characterized by the loss of subcutaneous fat localized to sites of insulin injection.

== See also ==
- Lipodystrophy
- List of cutaneous conditions
- Skin lesion
