= Lipoatrophia annularis =

- Other names: Ferreira–Marques lipoatrophia
- Specialty: Dermatology

Lipoatrophia annularis, also known as Ferreira–Marques lipoatrophia, is a skin condition affecting primarily women, characterized by the loss of subcutaneous fat in the upper extremity. It is a form of lipodystrophy.

== See also ==
- Lipoatrophia semicircularis
- List of cutaneous conditions
