= Involutional lipoatrophy =

Medical condition

- Specialty: Dermatology

Involutional lipoatrophy is a cutaneous condition, and is an idiopathic lipoatrophy characterized clinically by non-inflammatory focal loss of fat.

Idiopathic localized involutional lipoatrophy (ILIL) is a rare and nosologically imprecise condition characterized by a focal loss of subcutaneous tissue on one or several sites, occurring without any significant triggering factor or auto-immune background, and regressing spontaneously within a few months.

== See also ==
- Lipoatrophia annularis
- List of cutaneous conditions
