= Lipoatrophia semicircularis =

- Other names: Semicircular lipoatrophy
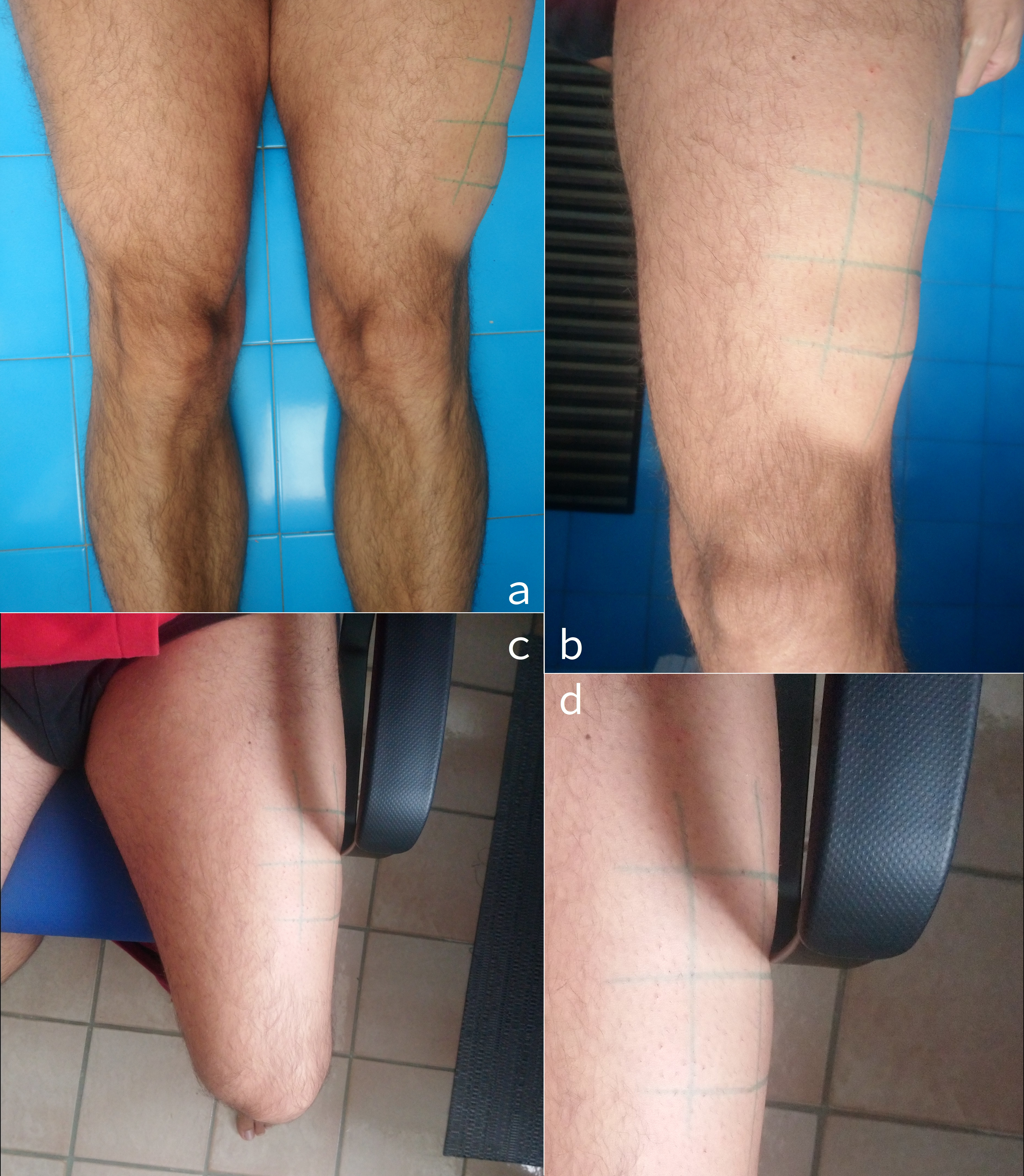
- Lipoatrophia semicircularis caused by armrest edge
- Specialty: Dermatology

Lipoatrophia semicircularis, also known as semicircular lipoatrophy, is a medical condition in humans, commonly known as ribbed thighs.

It consists of a semicircular zone of atrophy of the subcutaneous fatty tissue located mostly on the front of the thighs. Skin and underlying muscles remains intact.

Semicircular lipoatrophy affects women more commonly than men, but the exact prevalence is unknown. Those working in an office environment are more susceptible. The ribs in the thighs are typically between 2 and 4 cm high and are typically located at about 72 cm above the ground, which is the standard height of office furniture.

== Cause ==
It is not yet clear what causes semicircular lipoatrophy. Proposed contributing factors include localized pressure, blood circulation problems, or electrical phenomena, which may act in combination.

== Management ==
Treatment is focused on removing the environmental triggers. As multiple factors may be causal, numerous measures have been implemented to manage this condition, including:

- Adjusting chair height, to reduce physical contact between the thighs and the desk
- Applying antistatic products to surfaces which may harbour electrostatic charges
- Avoiding wearing tight clothing where possible

== Prognosis ==
The condition has a favourable prognosis, with most cases resolving within a few months of workplace adjustments.

== See also ==
- Lipodystrophy
- List of cutaneous conditions
