= Drug-induced lipodystrophy =

- Specialty: Dermatology

Drug-induced lipodystrophy is a cutaneous condition that presents as one or multiple depressed areas (i.e. indentations), usually on the proximal extremities, ranging from under a few centimeters to greater than 20 centimetres (7.9 in) in diameter.

== See also ==
- HIV-associated lipodystrophy
- Lipoatrophia semicircularis
