= Allergic reactions to anesthesia =

Anesthesia hypersensitivity
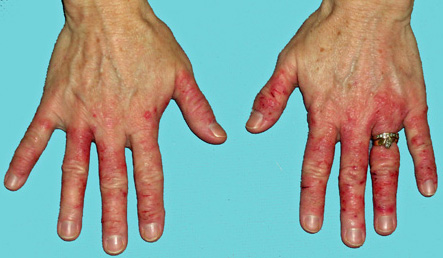
- Topical hypersensitivity reaction from topical anesthesia
- Specialty: Anesthesiology
- Symptoms: Low blood pressure, hives, wheezing, swelling
- Diagnostic method: Clinical diagnosis
- Treatment: Epinephrine, withdrawal of offending agent, airway management
- Frequency: 1 in 10,000 procedures

Life-threatening hypersensitivity reactions occurring during surgery and anesthesia is around 1 on 5,000 to 1 in 10,000 procedures. When using neuromuscular blocking agents, the rate of hypersensitivity reaction is about 1 in 6,500, most of which are severe reaction. While mild hypersensitivity reactions are not widely reported, it is estimated the rate of any hypersensitivity reaction is 1 in 386 to 1 in 13,000. Severe allergic reactions to anesthetic medications are rare and can be attributed to factors other than the anesthetic. Neuromuscular blocking agents and antibiotics are the most common triggers of a serious allergic reaction during surgery. Latex was once a major cause of severe hypersensitivity reactions but it is now less common with the introduction of latex-free products. The reported mortality rate from these reactions ranges between 1.4 to 4.8%.

Successful immediate treatment requires prompt recognition by the attending anesthetist, or in the United States, the attending anesthesiologist, nurse anesthetist, or anesthesiologist assistant. Anesthetists are trained to identify signs if an allergic reaction is occurring.

== Signs and Symptoms ==
Recognition of these symptoms may be difficult as they can overlap with normal symptoms of anesthesia. Mild reactions involve flushing and redness, hives, or swelling around the lips and eyes. Moderate reactions include a small drop in blood pressure, faster heart rate, and cough or wheezing. Severe reactions include a large drop in blood pressure, swelling of the throat, and brochospasm. Adrenaline (epinephrine) remains the mainstay of treatment for moderate and severe reactions, with corticosteroids and antihistamines providing limited benefit in the acute situation.

== Risk Factors and Mechanisms ==
Certain factors can increase a patient's sensitivity and incline them to a reaction. Patients with a history of drug allergies are at a higher risk of resulting in hypersensitivity reactions under anesthesia.

Most anesthetic related allergic reactions are IgE-mediated. These antibodies activate mast cells and basophils, which lead to the release of histamine along with other inflammatory mediators. This immune response results in tissues to swell, a difficulty in breathing, and bronchospasm.

Additionally, a large portion of anesthetic related allergic reactions are non IgE-mediate. Drugs can specifically activate mast cells through the MRGPRX2 receptor.

Other risk factors include past exposure to other anesthetic agents, genetics, and underlying medical conditions such as asthma or eczema. Reactions may also occur on the first exposure if the patient has been affected with similarly structured substances.

== Recognition and Management ==
Early recognition of an allergic reaction during anesthesia is crucial as hypersensitivity reactions can progress rapidly. The attending anesthesiologist or nurse anesthetist monitors for clinical signs the whole time anesthesia is being administered. A sudden drop in blood pressure, widespread rash, and airway or facial swelling are examples to what they are looking for. The most common feature is cardiovascular collapse and is often the first indication of a severe reaction.

== Most Common Drugs ==
Neuromuscular blocking agents and antibiotics are the leading cause of severe hypersensitivity and anaphylaxis in anesthesia. In countries like France, Norway, Belgium and Australia, neuromuscular blocking agents account for 50-70% of anaphylaxis in the operating room. In countries like Spain, the United States, and the United Kingdom, antibiotics are the leading cause of anaphylaxis. Additionally, sugammadex which is a reversal drug for neuromuscular blocking agents is becoming more widely used in anesthesia. Japan, which is the country that has the highest usage of sugammadex, is starting to recognize an increase in anaphylaxis to this drug. There is an estimated rate of anaphylaxis of 1.6 per 10,000 patients according to the American Society of Anesthesiologists.

All three drugs cause hypersensitivity reactions through similar pathways but how they start is different. All neuromuscular blocking agents have at least two ammonium groups. These ammonium groups can react to binding groups of IgE antibodies, which activates mast cells and basophils leading to anaphylaxis.

Among the neuromuscular blocking agents, succinylcholine and rocuronium have the highest rates of anaphylaxis. It is estimated that the rate of anaphylaxis is 1 in 2,080 patients for succinylcholine and 1 in 2,499 patients for rocuronium.

Antibiotics like beta-lactams are small molecules that bind directly to certain proteins in the blood. The binding causes a drug and protein makes a hapten carrier complex. This complex can bind to IgE molecules which activate mast cells. Beta-lactams are the most common cause of anaphylaxis with anesthesia with Cefazolin and amoxicillin the two most common antibiotics.

For sugammadex, it is still not completely understood what may cause the hypersensitivity reaction. It appears that the reactions are IgE-mediated. Some proposed mechanism is that sugammadex acts as an allergen itself, or the sugammadex-NMBA complex acts as allergen, leading to activation of IgE.

== Future Avoidance ==
Subsequent investigation aims to determine the responsible agent to allow its future avoidance. Skin testing is often useful to identify potentially cross-reactive compounds and appropriate therapeutic alternatives. This is done weeks after the initial reaction to allow the immune system to reset itself. However, skin testing can be misleading in giving false positive and false negative results.

== Anaphylaxis during anesthesia ==
Although complications during anesthesia are rare, potentially life-threatening consequences may occur if an anaphylactic reaction develops. The severity of the reaction whilst under anesthesia is because the anesthetist is only made aware of the allergy when it is severe enough to compromise the cardiovascular system and the respiratory system. At this stage, there is little time to manage the situation and recognize the severity of the condition.

The immediate management of the issue consists of three processes:

- The withdrawal of the substances
- Interrupting the effects of the preformed substances released in response to toxin presentation
- Prevention of further substance release

Since the full withdrawal of the offending substance is near impossible, the administration of adrenaline is the main treatment to counteract the effects. Once the patient is stable they will need close observation for 24 hours.

== Malignant Hyperthermia ==
Malignant hyperthermia is sometimes referred to as an adverse hypersensitivity reaction to anesthesia. This is a common misconception as it is not a hypersensitivity reaction but rather an inherited muscle disorder that reacts to anesthetic gases. Individuals with this disorder commonly have a mutation in the RYR1, CACNA1S, or STAC3 genes, which controls calcium release in muscle cells. When exposed to certain anesthetic gases or succinylcholine, it causes the muscles to release too much calcium. This causes muscles to contract and become rigid. This process creates a lot of heat and burns a lot of energy. This leads to increased body temperature, increased heart rate, and muscle breakdown. This reaction is treated with a drug called Dantrolene, which blocks the over release of calcium and helps muscle.
