= Sculptra =

Injectable dermal filler

Sculptra is a proprietary formulation of poly-L-lactic acid (PLLA) that is an FDA-approved dermal filler manufactured by Dermik Laboratories, which conducts the American business of Aventis Dermatology, the global dermatology unit of Aventis (of Sanofi-Aventis).

PLLA was approved by the FDA on August 3, 2004, for the treatment of facial fat loss (also called facial lipoatrophy). According to documents from the US Food and Drug Administration, the FDA initially approved the drug on the basis of small studies conducted on HIV patients, specifically "for restoration and/or correction of the signs of facial fat loss (lipoatrophy) in people with human immunodeficiency virus (HIV). Facial lipoatrophy is a condition in which people lose fat in their faces, especially in their cheeks and around their eyes and temples. People with HIV who take anti-HIV drugs may develop HIV-associated lipodystrophy. Sculptra was subsequently approved by the FDA for use with non-HIV patients with wrinkles, despite substantial complications reported to the FDA.

After the injection, it will take around 1 to 1.5 months to grow natural collagen. Bruising and swelling may occur post injection, which will go down within a week. After the injection, patients are directed to massage the treatment area in order to maintain smooth, level and evenly distributed results and prevent granuloma formation.

== Sculptra used in cosmetic medicine ==
Today, Sculptra is used "off label" for other aesthetic enhancements, such as a non-surgical butt lift, alongside a wide range of anatomical regions of the body for overall rejuvenatory effects.
