= Sheila Reith =

British inventor and physician

- Born: 1930s
- Occupation: Medical doctor
- Awards: Commander of the Order of the British Empire (2023)

Sheila Baillie Mackenzie Reith CBE is a retired British hospital physician, credited with co-invention of the insulin pen, which she conceived.

== Career ==
Reith graduated from University College London in 1962. She worked in London in the 1970s and then at the Southern General Hospital, Glasgow after she moved with her family to Scotland and became a specialist in the treatment of diabetes.

She had moved to Stirling Royal Infirmary by January 1981.

== Insulin pen ==
Reith's daughter was diagnosed with Type 1 diabetes when she was four. When her daughter was five, they travelled from Glasgow to London by train as the family relocated to Scotland, and Reith had to use the public toilets at Euston Station to inject her with insulin, a process involving drawing the insulin from a glass phial using a steel hypodermic syringe, which would later require being boiled to re-sterilise it. The inconvenience, discomfort and hygiene implications of this situation led her to conceive a reusable, cartridge-based system.

She developed the idea at the Southern General Hospital from 1978 with her colleague and fellow physician John Ireland, and John Paton, a bioengineer recruited at the University of Glasgow's Department of Clinical Physics and Bio-Engineering, for the project.

The invention was announced in a January 1981 paper in The Lancet by Reith alongside Ireland, Paton and Margaret Wilson, also of Southern General. It described the use of the prototype, based on a device known as the Becton-Dickinson 'Plastipak' self-contained insulin syringe, by seven patients aged from 8 to 49. Further clinical trials commenced the same year, using 100 pens and 5,000 insulin cartridges funded by Diabetes UK. Within two years the world's first insulin pen, branded "Penject", entered general use.

Reith revealed in a 2009 letter to the Journal of the Royal College of Physicians of Edinburgh that she and her colleagues made no money from the invention, with the then Greater Glasgow Health Board holding the patent on their behalf and receiving income until it sold the rights to pharmaceutical company Novo.

== Awards and recognition ==
Reith and her two collaborators were recognised on 28 March 1984 in an early day motion in the House of Commons, tabled by Michael Forsyth and other MPs.

She was made a Commander of the Order of the British Empire (CBE) in the 2023 Birthday Honours, "for services to people with diabetes".

She was given a Lifetime Achievement award at the 2024 Pride Of Britain Awards.

== Personal life ==
Reith's husband David who also worked for the NHS is deceased. She has at least one son and one daughter.
