= HIV-associated lipodystrophy =

- Other names: Lipodystrophy in HIV-infected patients (LD-HIV)
- Specialty: Immunology, dermatology, infectious diseases, endocrinology

HIV-associated lipodystrophy is a condition characterized by loss of subcutaneous fat associated with infection with HIV.

== Presentation ==
HIV-associated lipodystrophy commonly presents with fat loss in face, buttocks, arms and legs.

There is also fat accumulation in various body parts. Patients often present with "buffalo hump"-like fat deposits in their upper backs. Breast size of patients (both male and female) tends to increase. In addition, patients develop abdominal obesity.

== Cause ==
The exact mechanism of HIV-associated lipodystrophy is not fully elucidated. There is evidence indicating both that it can be caused by anti-retroviral medications and that it can be caused by HIV infection in the absence of anti-retroviral medication.

=== Evidence implicating anti-retroviral medications ===
The development of lipoatrophy in people living with HIV has been historically linked to specific classes of early antiretroviral therapy (ART). Initial treatment regimens typically combined a protease inhibitor (PI) with two nucleoside reverse transcriptase inhibitors (NRTIs), specifically thymidine analogs like stavudine (d4T) and zidovudine (AZT). While these drugs helped maintain CD4 T-cell levels, they were strongly associated with changes in lipid metabolism and significant subcutaneous fat loss, often resulting in a 30% reduction of fat in the extremities and noticeable facial wasting. Other older drugs, such as the non-nucleoside reverse transcriptase inhibitor (NNRTI) efavirenz, have also been implicated in fat loss.

The incidence of the condition dropped dramatically following the transition to newer, less toxic medications. By the late 2000s, clinical guidelines recommended replacing zidovudine with tenofovir disoproxil fumarate (TDF), which exhibited significantly lower lipoatrophic effects. This was further improved by the introduction of tenofovir alafenamide (TAF), which is largely devoid of lipodystrophy.

=== Evidence implicating HIV infection alone ===
On the other hand, there is evidence that HIV-1 infection on its own contributes to the development of the lipodystrophic phenotype by interfering with some key genes of adipocyte differentiation and mitochondrial function on patients which have not received antiretroviral treatment.

== Management ==
Injectable fillers, including the calcium hydroxylapatite-based Radiesse and poly-L-lactic acid-based Sculptra, are indicated to restore volume lost due to HIV-associated facial lipoatrophy.

GHRH analogs such as tesamorelin can be used to treat HIV-associated lipodystrophy.

== Prognosis ==
Reversion of lipodystrophy does not occur after withdrawal of protease inhibitors.

== See also ==
- Drug-induced lipodystrophy
- Lipodystrophy
- List of cutaneous conditions
