= Lipoatrophy =

Localized loss of fat tissue

- Differential diagnosis: due to treatment for MS

Lipoatrophy is the term describing the localized loss of fat tissue. This may occur as a result of subcutaneous injections of insulin in the treatment of diabetes, from the use of human growth hormone or from subcutaneous injections of copaxone used for the treatment of multiple sclerosis. In the latter case, an injection may produce a small dent at the injection site. Lipoatrophy occurs in HIV-associated lipodystrophy, one cause of which is an adverse drug reaction that is associated with some antiretroviral medications.

A more general term for an abnormal or degenerative condition of the entire body's adipose tissue is lipodystrophy.
