= Importin =

Protein family

Importin subunit alpha-5

Identifiers
- Symbol: KPNA1
- NCBI gene: 3836
- HGNC: 6394
- OMIM: 600686
- RefSeq: NP_002255
- UniProt: P52294

Other data
- Locus: Chr. 3 q21.1
Search for
- Structures: Swiss-model
- Domains: InterPro

Importin subunit beta-1

Identifiers
- Symbol: KPNB1
- NCBI gene: 3837
- HGNC: 6400
- OMIM: 602738
- RefSeq: NP_002256
- UniProt: Q14974

Other data
- Locus: Chr. 17 q21.32
Search for
- Structures: Swiss-model
- Domains: InterPro

Importin is a type of karyopherin involved in the nuclear transport of moving protein molecules from a cell's cytoplasm to the nucleus. It does so by binding to specific recognition sequences, called nuclear localization sequences (NLS).

Importin has two subunits, importin α and importin β. Members of the importin-β family can bind and transport cargo by themselves, or can form heterodimers with importin-α. As part of a heterodimer, importin-β mediates interactions with the pore complex, while importin-α acts as an adaptor protein to bind the nuclear localization signal (NLS) on the cargo. The NLS-Importin α-Importin β trimer dissociates after binding to Ran GTP inside the nucleus, with the two importin proteins being recycled to the cytoplasm for further use.

== Discovery ==
Importin can exist as either a heterodimer of importin-α/β or as a monomer of Importin-β. Importin-α was first isolated in 1994 by a group including Enno Hartmann, based at the Max Delbrück Center for Molecular Medicine. The process of nuclear protein import had already been characterised in previous reviews, but the key proteins involved had not been elucidated up until that point. A 60 kDa cytosolic protein, essential for protein import into the nucleus, and with a 44% sequence identity to SRP1p, was purified from Xenopus eggs. It was cloned, sequenced and expressed in E.coli and in order to completely reconstitute signal dependent transport, had to be combined with Ran(TC4). Other key stimulatory factors were also found in the study.

Importin-β, unlike importin-α, has no direct homologues in yeast, but was purified as a 90-95 kDa protein and found to form a heterodimer with importin-α in a number of different cases. These included a study led by Michael Rexach and further studies by Dirk Görlich. These groups found that importin-α requires another protein, importin-β to function, and that together they form a receptor for nuclear localization signals (NLS), thus allowing transport into the nucleus. Since these initial discoveries in 1994 and 1995, a host of Importin genes, such as IPO4 and IPO7, have been found that facilitate the import of slightly different cargo proteins, due to their differing structure and locality.

== Structure ==
=== Importin-α ===
A large proportion of the importin-α adaptor protein is made up of several armadillo repeats (ARM) arranged in tandem. These repeats can stack together to form a curved-shaped structure, which facilitates binding to the NLS of specific cargo proteins. The major NLS binding site is found towards the N-terminus, with a minor site being found at the C-terminus. As well as the ARM structures, Importin-α also contains a 90 amino acid N-terminal region, responsible for binding to Importin-β, known as the Importin-β binding (IBB)domain. This is also a site of autoinhibition, and is implicated in the release of cargo once importin-α reaches the nucleus.

=== Importin-β ===
Importin-β is the typical structure of a larger superfamily of karyopherins. The basis of their structure is 18-20 tandem repeats of the HEAT motif. Each one of these repeats contains two antiparallel alpha helices linked by a turn, which stack together to form the overall structure of the protein.

In order to transport cargo into the nucleus, importin-β must associate with the nuclear pore complexes. It does this by forming weak, transient bonds with nucleoporins at their various FG (Phe-Gly) motifs. Crystallographic analysis has shown that these motifs bind to importin-β at shallow hydrophobic pockets found on its surface.

== Nuclear protein import cycle ==
The primary function of importin is to mediate the translocation of proteins with nuclear localization signals into the nucleus, through nuclear pore complexes (NPC), in a process known as the nuclear protein import cycle.

=== Cargo binding ===
The first step of this cycle is the binding of cargo. Importin can perform this function as a monomeric importin-β protein, but usually requires the presence of importin-α, which acts as an adaptor to cargo proteins (via interactions with the NLS). The NLS is a sequence of basic amino acids that tags the protein as cargo destined for the nucleus. A cargo protein can contain either one or two of these motifs, which will bind to the major and/or minor binding sites on importin-α.

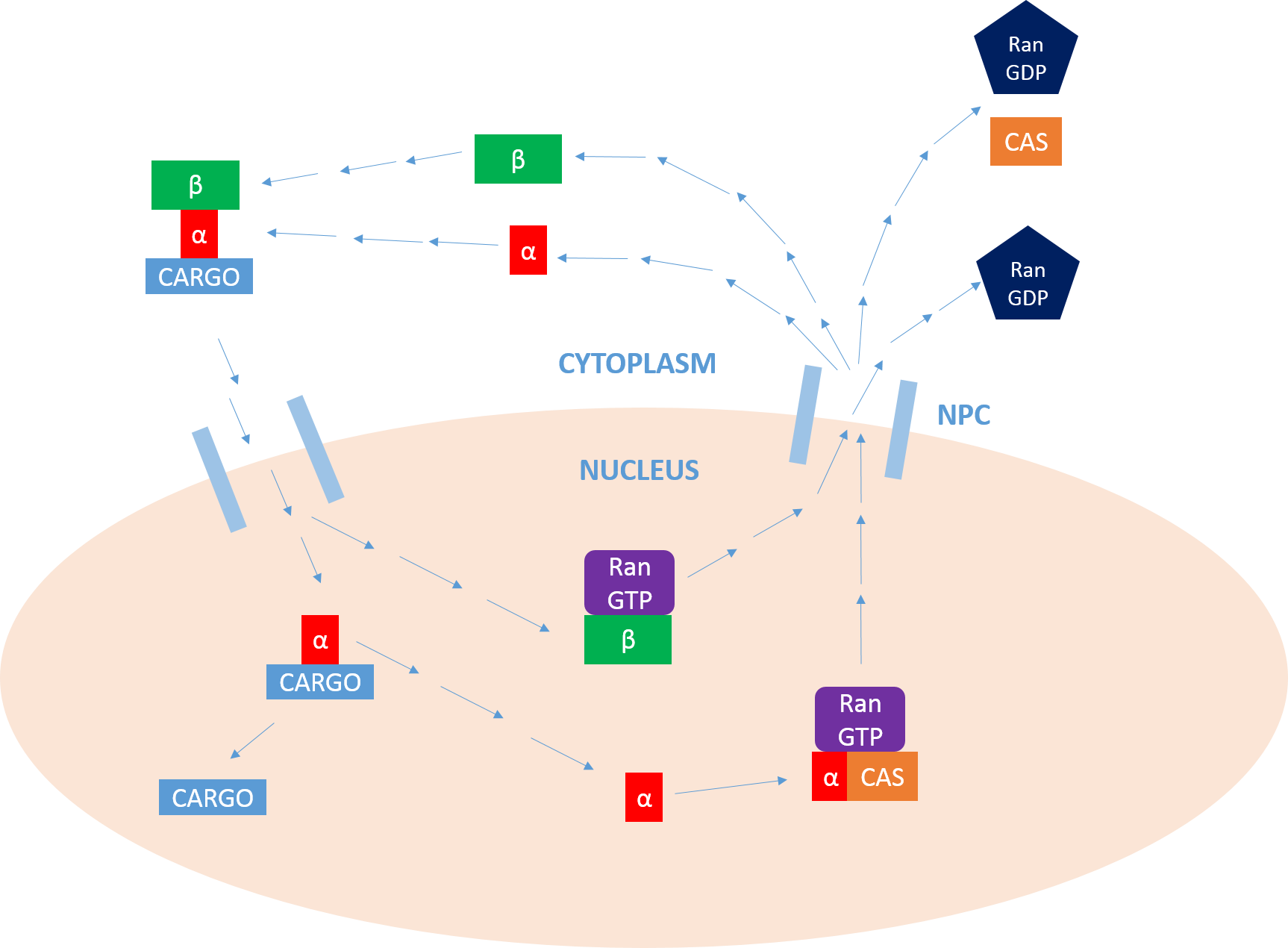
Overview of the nuclear protein import cycle.

=== Cargo transport ===
Once the cargo protein is bound, importin-β interacts with the NPC, and the complex diffuses into the nucleus from the cytoplasm. The rate of diffusion depends on both the concentration of importin-α present in the cytoplasm and also the binding affinity of importin-α to the cargo. Once inside the nucleus, the complex interacts with the Ras-family GTPase, Ran-GTP. This leads to the dissociation of the complex by altering the conformation of importin-β. Importin-β is left bound to Ran-GTP, ready to be recycled.

=== Cargo release ===
Now that the importin-α/cargo complex is free of importin-β, the cargo protein can be released into the nucleus. The N-terminal importin-β-binding (IBB) domain of importin-α contains an auto-regulatory region that mimics the NLS motif. The release of importin-β frees this region and allows it to loop back and compete for binding with the cargo protein at the major NLS-binding site. This competition leads to the release of the protein. In some cases, specific release factors such as Nup2 and Nup50 can be employed to help release the cargo as well.

=== Recycling ===
Finally, in order to return to the cytoplasm, importin-α must associate with a Ran-GTP/CAS (nuclear export factor) complex which facilitates its exit from the nucleus. CAS (cellular apoptosis susceptibility protein) is part of the importin-β superfamily of karyopherins and is defined as a nuclear export factor. Importin-β returns to the cytoplasm, still bound to Ran-GTP. Once in the cytoplasm, Ran-GTP is hydrolysed by RanGAP, forming Ran-GDP, and releasing the two importins for further activity. It is this hydrolysis of GTP that provides the energy for the cycle as a whole. In the nucleus, a GEF will charge Ran with a GTP molecule, which is then hydrolysed by a GAP in the cytoplasm, as stated above. It is this activity of Ran that allows for the unidirectional transport of proteins.

== Neuronal functions ==
Importin β1 is also involved in retrograde signalling induced by axonal injury. After injury, importin β1 mRNA is translated locally in axons and participates in the formation of signalling complexes that are transported to the cell body. A localisation element located in the untranslated region (3′UTR) of the importin β1 transcript is necessary for axonal localisation of its mRNA and for local translation of the protein. Subcellular deletion of importin β1 in axons reduces retrograde signalling to the cell body and affects functional recovery after peripheral nerve injury. Subcellular deletion of the 3′UTR region of importin β1 also leads to alterations in brain function, particularly memory, due to impaired presynaptic long-term potentiation and decreased local protein synthesis in the mossy fibre terminals of the hippocampus. These findings suggest an additional role for importin β1 in the organisation of presynaptic architecture and the maintenance of neural circuits in the central nervous system.

== Disease ==
There are several disease states and pathologies that are associated with mutations or changes in expression of importin-α and importin-β.

Importins are vital regulatory proteins during the processes of gametogenesis and embryogenesis. As a result, a disruption in the expression patterns of importin-α has been shown to cause fertility defects in Drosophila melanogaster.

There have also been studies that link altered importin-α to some cases of cancer. Breast cancer studies have implicated a truncated form of importin-α in which the NLS binding domain is missing. In addition, importin-α has been shown to transport the tumour suppressor gene, BRCA1 (breast cancer type 1 susceptibility protein), into the nucleus. The overexpression of importin-α has also been linked with poor survival rates seen in certain melanoma patients.

Importin activity is also associated with some viral pathologies. For instance, in the infection pathway of the Ebola virus, a key step is the inhibition of the nuclear import of PY-STAT1. This is achieved by the virus sequestering importin-α in the cytoplasm, meaning it can no longer bind its cargo at the NLS. As a result, importin cannot function and the cargo protein stays in the cytoplasm.

== Types of cargo ==
Many different cargo proteins can be transported into the nucleus by importin. Often, different proteins will require different combinations of α and β in order to translocate. Some examples of different cargo are listed below.

Cargo	Import Receptor
SV40	Importin-β and importin-α
Nucleoplasmin	Importin-β and importin-α
STAT1	Importin-β and NPI-1 (type of importin-α)
TFIIA	Importin-α not required
U1A	Importin-α not required

== Human importin genes ==
Although importin-α and importin-β are used to describe importin as a whole, they actually represent larger families of proteins that share a similar structure and function. Various different genes have been identified for both α and β, with some of them listed below. Note that often karyopherin and importin are used interchangeably.

- Importin: IPO4, IPO5, IPO7, IPO8, IPO9, IPO11, IPO13
- Karyopherin-α: KPNA1, KPNA2, KPNA3, KPNA4, KPNA5, KPNA6
- Karyopherin-β: KPNB1
