= IPO5 =

Protein-coding gene in the species Homo sapiens

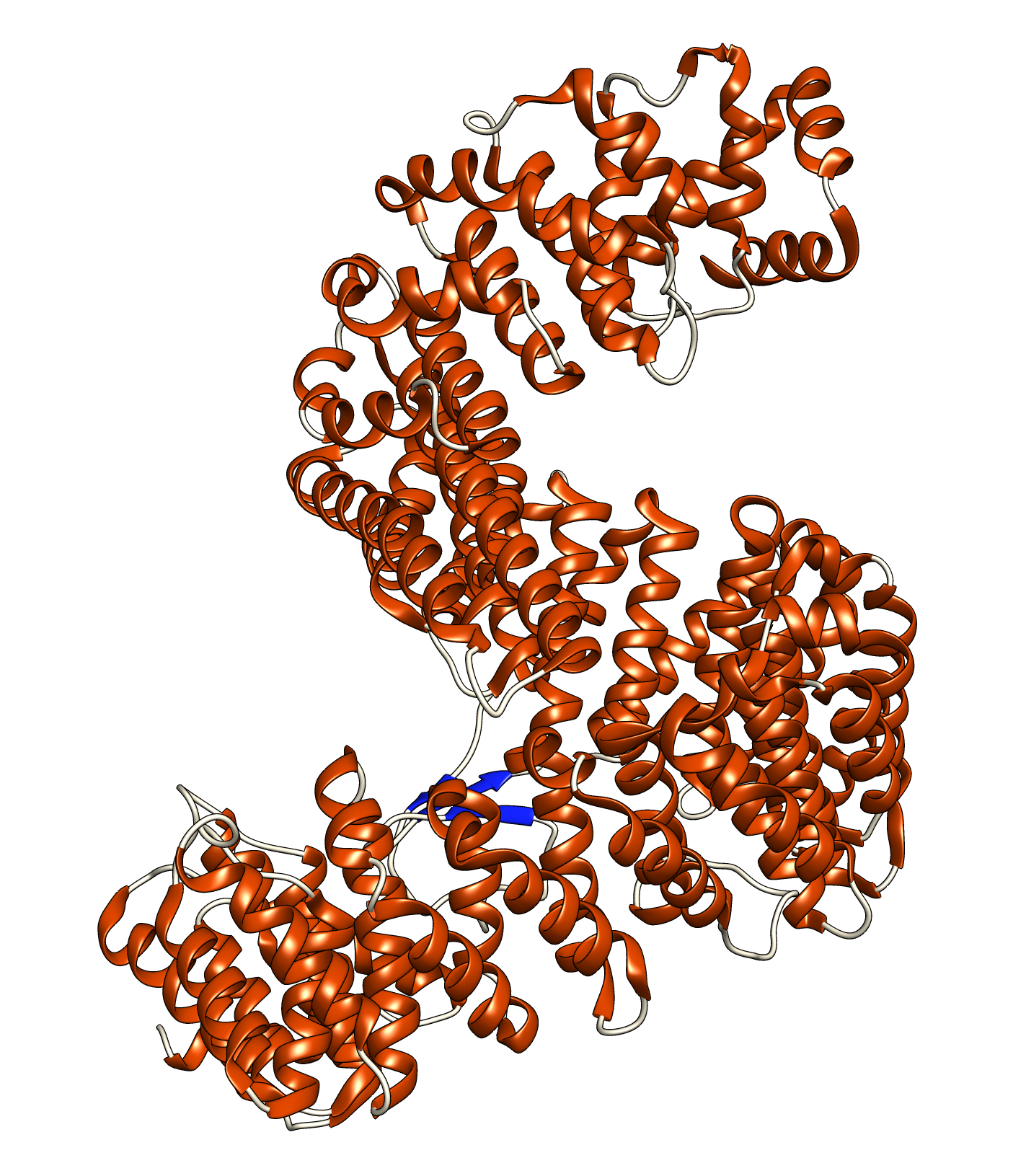

Identifiers
- Aliases: IPO5, IMB3, KPNB3, Pse1, RANBP5, imp5, importin 5
- External IDs: OMIM: 602008; MGI: 1917822; GeneCards: IPO5

Gene location (Human)
Chr.	Chromosome 13 (human)
Band	13q32.2	Start	97,953,658 bp
Band	13q32.2	End	98,024,296 bp

Gene location (Mouse)
Chr.	Chromosome 14 (mouse)
Band	14|14 E4- E5	Start	121,148,636 bp
Band	14|14 E4- E5	End	121,185,411 bp
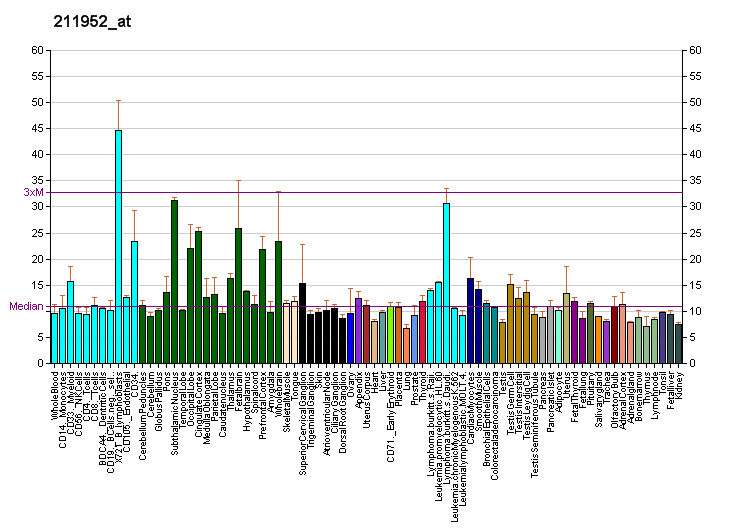

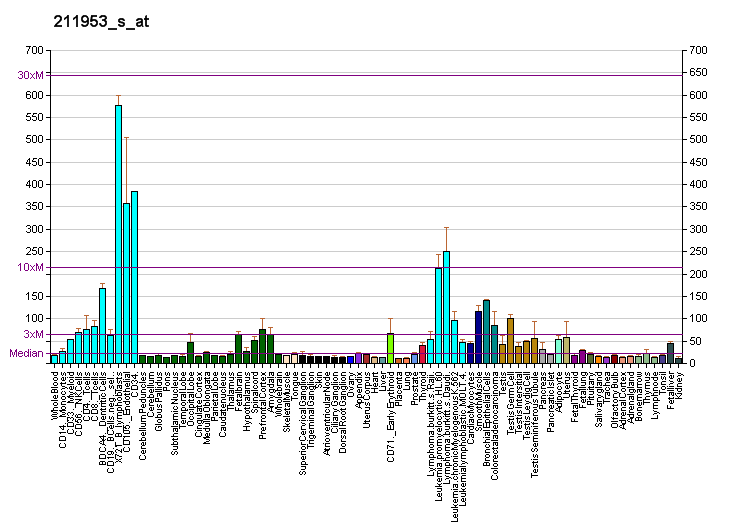

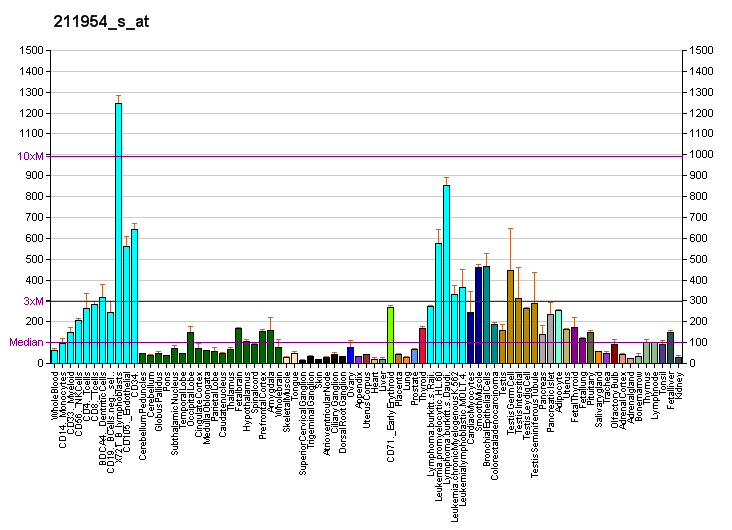
RNA expression pattern
Bgee	Human / Mouse (ortholog); Top expressed in: sperm; left testis; right testis; ventricular zone; embryo; cartilage tissue; ganglionic eminence; body of pancreas; gastrocnemius muscle; stromal cell of endometrium / Top expressed in: seminiferous tubule; primitive streak; epiblast; somite; lens; tail of embryo; spermatid; medullary collecting duct; ventricular zone; mandibular prominence; More reference expression data
BioGPS	More reference expression data
Gene ontology
Molecular function	GTPase inhibitor activity; protein binding; nuclear localization sequence binding; RNA binding; nuclear import signal receptor activity
Cellular component	membrane; nuclear periphery; nuclear pore; nucleolus; nucleus; nuclear membrane; cytoplasm
Biological process	ribosomal protein import into nucleus; cellular response to amino acid stimulus; protein transport; positive regulation of protein import into nucleus; viral process; intracellular protein transport; negative regulation of GTPase activity; NLS-bearing protein import into nucleus; transport; protein import into nucleus; negative regulation of cyclin-dependent protein serine/threonine kinase activity
Sources:Amigo / QuickGO
Orthologs
Databases	NCBI: entry; OMA: entry
Species	Human	Mouse
Entrez	3843	70572
Ensembl	ENSG00000065150	ENSMUSG00000030662
UniProt	O00410	Q8BKC5
RefSeq (mRNA)	NM_002271	NM_023579; NM_001360602
RefSeq (protein)	NP_002262	NP_076068; NP_001347531
Location (UCSC)	Chr 13: 97.95 – 98.02 Mb	Chr 14: 121.15 – 121.19 Mb
PubMed search
- Wikidata
View/Edit Human	View/Edit Mouse

Importin-5 is a protein that in humans is encoded by the IPO5 gene. The protein encoded by this gene is a member of the importin beta family. Structurally, the protein adopts the shape of a right hand solenoid and is composed of 24 HEAT repeats.

== Function ==
Nuclear transport, a signal- and energy-dependent process, takes place through nuclear pore complexes embedded in the nuclear envelope. The import of proteins containing a nuclear localization signal (NLS) requires the NLS import receptor, a heterodimer of importin alpha and beta subunits also known as karyopherins. Importin alpha binds the NLS-containing cargo in the cytoplasm and importin beta docks the complex at the cytoplasmic side of the nuclear pore complex. In the presence of nucleoside triphosphates and the small GTP binding protein Ran, the complex moves into the nuclear pore complex and the importin subunits dissociate. Importin alpha enters the nucleoplasm with its passenger protein and importin beta remains at the pore. Interactions between importin beta and the FG repeats of nucleoporins are essential in translocation through the pore complex.

IPO5 facilitates cytoplasmic polyadenylation element-binding protein (CPEB)3 translocation by binding to RRM1 motif of CPEB3 in neurons. NMDAR signaling increases RanBP1 expression and reduces the level of cytoplasmic GTP-bound Ran. These changes enhance CPEB3–IPO5 interaction, which consequently accelerates the nuclear import of CPEB3 and promotes its nuclear function.
