= Nuclear export signal =

Amino acid sequence causing a protein to be exported from the nucleus to the cytoplasm

A nuclear export signal (NES) is a short target peptide containing 4 hydrophobic residues in a protein that targets it for export from the cell nucleus to the cytoplasm through the nuclear pore complex using nuclear transport. It has the opposite effect of a nuclear localization signal, which targets a protein located in the cytoplasm for import to the nucleus. The NES is recognized and bound by exportins.

NESs serve several vital cellular functions. They assist in regulating the position of proteins within the cell. Through this NESs affect transcription and several other nuclear functions that are essential to proper cell function. The export of many types of RNA from the nucleus is required for proper cellular function. The NES determines what type of pathway the varying types of RNA may use to exit the nucleus and perform their function and the NESs may effect the directionality of molecules exiting the nucleus.

== Structure ==
Computer analysis of known NESs found the most common spacing of the hydrophobic residues to be LxxxLxxLxL, where "L" is a hydrophobic residue (often leucine) and "x" is any other amino acid; the spacing of these hydrophobic residues may be explained by examination of known structures that contain an NES, as the critical residues usually lie in the same face of adjacent secondary structures within a protein, which allows them to interact with the exportin. Ribonucleic acid (RNA) is composed of nucleotides, and thus, lacks the nuclear export signal to move out of the nucleus. As a result, most forms of RNA will bind to a protein molecule to form a ribonucleoprotein complex to be exported from the nucleus.

Eukaryotic Linear Motif resource defines the NES motif for exportin within a single entry, TRG_NES_CRM1_1. The single-letter amino acid sequence pattern of NES, in regular expression format, is:

([DEQ].{0,1}[LIM].{2,3}[LIVMF][^P]{2,3}[LMVF].[LMIV].{0,3}[DE])|
([DE].{0,1}[LIM].{2,3}[LIVMF][^P]{2,3}[LMVF].[LMIV].{0,3}[DEQ])

In the above expression, LIMVF are all hydrophobic residues, while DEQ are hydrophilic aspartic acid, glutamic acid, and glutamine. In human language, this is an extension of the "common pattern" that includes hydrophilic residues surrounding it as well as slight variations in the length of xxx and xx fragments seen above.

== Mechanism ==
Nuclear export first begins with the binding of Ran-GTP (a G-protein) to exportin. This causes a shape change in exportin, increasing its affinity for the export cargo. Once the cargo is bound, the Ran-exportin-cargo complex moves out of the nucleus through the nuclear pore. GTPase activating proteins (GAPs) then hydrolyze the Ran-GTP to Ran-GDP, and this causes a shape change and subsequent exportin release. Once no longer bound to Ran, the exportin molecule loses affinity for the nuclear cargo as well, and the complex falls apart. Exportin and Ran-GDP are recycled to the nucleus separately, and guanine exchange factor (GEF) in the nucleus switches the GDP for GTP on Ran.

== Chemotherapy ==
The process of nuclear export is responsible for some resistance to chemotherapy drugs. By limiting a cell's nuclear export activity it may be possible to reverse this resistance. By inhibiting CRM1, the export receptor, export through the nuclear envelope may be slowed. Survivin is a NES that inhibits cellular apoptosis. It interacts with the mitotic spindles during cellular division. Due to the usually rapid proliferation of tumour cells, survivin is more expressed during the presence of cancer. The level of survivin correlates to how resistance to chemotherapy a cancerous cell is and how likely that cell is to replicate again. By producing antibodies to target the NES survivin, apoptosis of cancerous cells can be increased.

== Examples ==
NES signals were first discovered in the human immunodeficiency virus type 1 (HIV-1) Rev protein and cAMP-dependent protein kinase inhibitor (PKI). The karyopherin receptor CRM1 has been identified as the export receptor for leucine-rich NESs in several organisms and is an evolutionarily conserved protein. The export mediated by CRM1 can be effectively inhibited by the fungicide leptomycin B (LMB), providing excellent experimental verification of this pathway.

Other proteins of various functions have also been experimentally inhibited of the NES signal such as the cyto-skeletal protein actin, which functions include cell motility and growth. The use of LBM as a NES inhibitor proved successful for actin resulting in accumulation of the protein within the nucleus, concluding universal functionality of NES throughout various protein functional groups.

== Regulation ==
Not all NES substrates are constitutively exported from the nucleus, meaning that CRM1-mediated export is a regulated event. Several ways of regulating NES-dependent export have been reported. These include masking/unmasking of NESs, phosphorylation and even disulfide bond formation as a result of oxidation.

The binding of NES to the export receptor of a protein gives the universal export function of NES an individually specified activation of export to each protein. Studies of specified NES amino acid sequences for particular proteins show the possibility of blocking the NES activation of one protein with an inhibitor for that amino acid sequence while other proteins of the same nucleus remain unaffected.

== NESbase ==
NESbase is a database of proteins with experimentally verified leucine-rich nuclear export signals (NES). The verification is performed by, among others, Technical University of Denmark Center for Biological Sequence Analysis and University of Copenhagen Department of Protein Chemistry. Every entry in its database includes information whether nuclear export signals were sufficient for export or if it was only mediated transport by CRM1 (exportin).
