= Exportin-2 =

Protein found in humans

CSE1L

Identifiers
- Aliases: CSE1L, CAS, CSE1, XPO2, chromosome segregation 1 like
- External IDs: OMIM: 601342; MGI: 1339951; GeneCards: CSE1L

Gene location (Human)
Chr.	Chromosome 20 (human)
Band	20q13.13	Start	49,046,246 bp
Band	20q13.13	End	49,096,960 bp

Gene location (Mouse)
Chr.	Chromosome 2 (mouse)
Band	2 H3|2 87.22 cM	Start	166,747,960 bp
Band	2 H3|2 87.22 cM	End	166,788,309 bp
RNA expression pattern
Bgee	Human / Mouse (ortholog); Top expressed in: gonad; endothelial cell; embryo; ganglionic eminence; ventricular zone; gums; gingival epithelium; sperm; oral cavity; right testis / Top expressed in: tail of embryo; genital tubercle; epiblast; ventricular zone; spermatid; mesencephalon; embryo; ganglionic eminence; embryo; neural tube; More reference expression data
BioGPS	n/a
Gene ontology
Molecular function	nuclear export signal receptor activity; protein binding
Cellular component	extracellular exosome; nucleus; membrane; nucleoplasm; cytoplasm; nuclear envelope; cytosol
Biological process	protein transport; cell population proliferation; intracellular protein transport; apoptotic process; protein export from nucleus; protein import into nucleus; transport
Sources:Amigo / QuickGO
Orthologs
Databases	NCBI: entry; OMA: entry
Species	Human	Mouse
Entrez	1434	110750
Ensembl	ENSG00000124207	ENSMUSG00000002718
UniProt	P55060	Q9ERK4
RefSeq (mRNA)	NM_001256135; NM_001316; NM_177436; NM_001362762	NM_023565
RefSeq (protein)	NP_001243064; NP_001307; NP_001349691	NP_076054
Location (UCSC)	Chr 20: 49.05 – 49.1 Mb	Chr 2: 166.75 – 166.79 Mb
PubMed search
- Wikidata
View/Edit Human	View/Edit Mouse

Exportin-2 is a protein that in humans is encoded by the CSE1L gene (previously CAS). It functions an exportin which in the nucleus is bound to RanGTP.

== Function ==
The Cas family of proteins are a family of proteins that induce cellular apoptosis and cell proliferation. Apoptosis is a specialized sequence of events that a cell can induce for programmed death. Cas is a 2 terminal protein, a N-terminal and a C-terminal, and there is a positive correlation between the presence of CAS and the degree of cellular proliferation. Along with this correlation, in the absence of the CAS protein in a cell, there is an inhibition of apoptosis Along with being an inducer of apoptosis, CAS also plays a role in being a checkpoint for cell cycle. Without the CAS protein, a cell will not be able to go beyond the G2 phase. It is in the nucleus of the cell, where its exportin function comes into play.

== See also ==
- Nuclear pore#Import of proteins
