= IPO7 =

Protein-coding gene in the species Homo sapiens

Identifiers
- Aliases: IPO7, Imp7, RANBP7, importin 7
- External IDs: OMIM: 605586; MGI: 2152414; GeneCards: IPO7

Gene location (Human)
Chr.	Chromosome 11 (human)
Band	11p15.4	Start	9,384,652 bp
Band	11p15.4	End	9,448,127 bp

Gene location (Mouse)
Chr.	Chromosome 7 (mouse)
Band	7|7 E3	Start	109,617,481 bp
Band	7|7 E3	End	109,655,816 bp
RNA expression pattern
Bgee	Human / Mouse (ortholog); Top expressed in: glutes; cartilage tissue; Skeletal muscle tissue of rectus abdominis; muscle of arm; biceps brachii; Skeletal muscle tissue of biceps brachii; lower lobe of lung; triceps brachii muscle; deltoid muscle; tail of epididymis / Top expressed in: parotid gland; temporal muscle; digastric muscle; abdominal wall; triceps brachii muscle; lacrimal gland; sternocleidomastoid muscle; mandibular prominence; primitive streak; medial ganglionic eminence; More reference expression data
BioGPS	n/a
Gene ontology
Molecular function	histone binding; protein binding; GTPase regulator activity; transporter activity; SMAD binding
Cellular component	nuclear pore; membrane; nucleus; nucleoplasm; cytoplasm; cytosol; nuclear envelope
Biological process	protein transport; innate immune response; viral process; intracellular protein transport; signal transduction; regulation of catalytic activity; protein import into nucleus; transport; negative regulation of cyclin-dependent protein serine/threonine kinase activity
Sources:Amigo / QuickGO
Orthologs
Databases	NCBI: entry; OMA: entry
Species	Human	Mouse
Entrez	10527	233726
Ensembl	ENSG00000205339	ENSMUSG00000066232
UniProt	O95373	Q9EPL8
RefSeq (mRNA)	NM_006391	NM_181517; NM_001362172
RefSeq (protein)	NP_006382	NP_852658; NP_001349101
Location (UCSC)	Chr 11: 9.38 – 9.45 Mb	Chr 7: 109.62 – 109.66 Mb
PubMed search
- Wikidata
View/Edit Human	View/Edit Mouse

Importin-7 is a protein that in humans is encoded by the IPO7 gene.

The importin-alpha/beta complex and the GTPase Ran mediate nuclear import of proteins with a classical nuclear localization signal. The protein encoded by this gene is a member of a class of approximately 20 potential Ran targets that share a sequence motif related to the Ran-binding site of importin-beta. Similar to importin-beta, this protein prevents the activation of Ran's GTPase by RanGAP1 and inhibits nucleotide exchange on RanGTP, and also binds directly to nuclear pore complexes where it competes for binding sites with importin-beta and transportin. This protein has a Ran-dependent transport cycle and it can cross the nuclear envelope rapidly and in both directions. At least four importin beta-like transport receptors, namely importin beta itself, transportin, RanBP5 and RanBP7, directly bind and import ribosomal proteins.
