= CAS/CSE protein family =

CAS/CSE protein, C-terminus
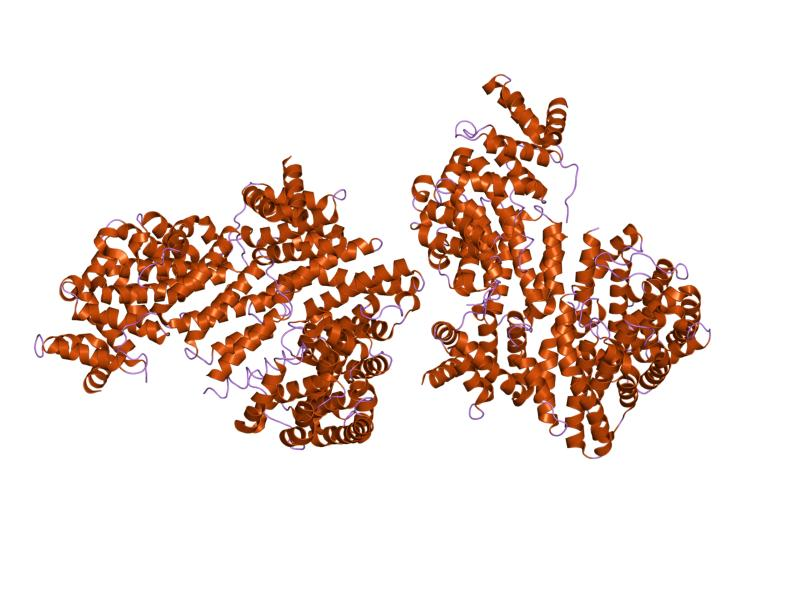
- the exportin cse1 in its cargo-free, cytoplasmic state

Identifiers
- Symbol: CAS_CSE1
- Pfam: PF03378
- InterPro: IPR005043
Available protein structures:
- Pfam: structures / ECOD
- PDB: RCSB PDB; PDBe; PDBj
- PDBsum: structure summary

Cse1
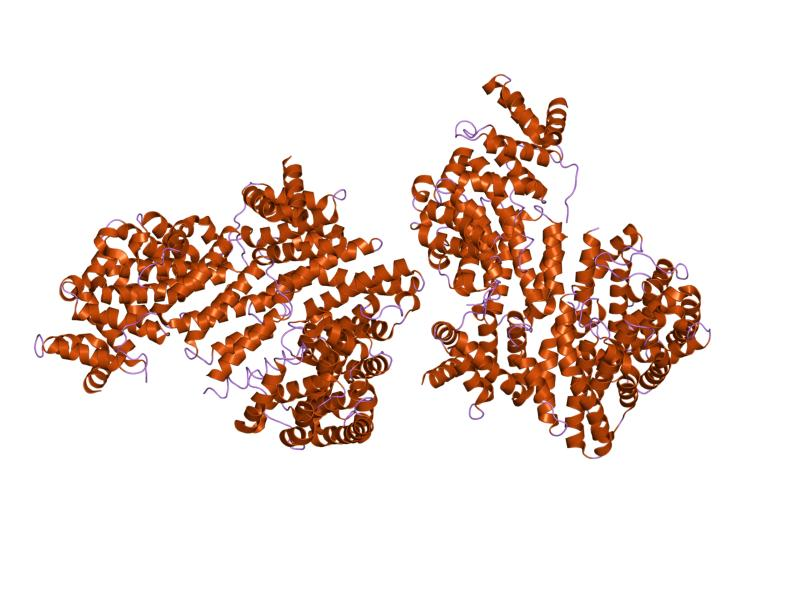
- the exportin cse1 in its cargo-free, cytoplasmic state

Identifiers
- Symbol: Cse1
- Pfam: PF08506
- Pfam clan: CL0020
- InterPro: IPR013713
Available protein structures:
- Pfam: structures / ECOD
- PDB: RCSB PDB; PDBe; PDBj
- PDBsum: structure summary

In molecular biology, the CAS/CSE protein family is a family of proteins which includes mammalian cellular apoptosis susceptibility (CAS) proteins and yeast chromosome-segregation protein, CSE1. CAS is involved in both cellular apoptosis and proliferation. Apoptosis is inhibited in CAS-depleted cells, while the expression of CAS correlates to the degree of cellular proliferation. Like CSE1, it is essential for the mitotic checkpoint in the cell cycle (CAS depletion blocks the cell in the G2 phase), and has been shown to be associated with the microtubule network and the mitotic spindle, as is the protein MEK, which is thought to regulate the intracellular localization (predominantly nuclear vs. predominantly cytosolic) of CAS. In the nucleus, CAS acts as a nuclear transport factor in the importin pathway. The importin pathway mediates the nuclear transport of several proteins that are necessary for mitosis and further progression. CAS is therefore thought to affect the cell cycle through its effect on the nuclear transport of these proteins. Since apoptosis also requires the nuclear import of several proteins (such as P53 and transcription factors), it has been suggested that CAS also enables apoptosis by facilitating the nuclear import of at least a subset of these essential proteins.

Members of the CAS/CSE family of proteins have two domains. An N-terminal Cse1 domain, which contains HEAT repeats, and a C-terminal domain.
