= Importin subunit alpha-6 =

Protein-coding gene in the species Homo sapiens

KPNA5

Identifiers
- Aliases: KPNA5, IPOA6, SRP6, karyopherin subunit alpha 5
- External IDs: OMIM: 604545; GeneCards: KPNA5
Available structures
PDB	Human UniProt search: PDBe RCSB
PDB	List of PDB id codes 4U2X

Gene location (Human)
Chr.	Chromosome 6 (human)
Band	6q22.1	Start	116,681,187 bp
Band	6q22.1	End	116,741,866 bp
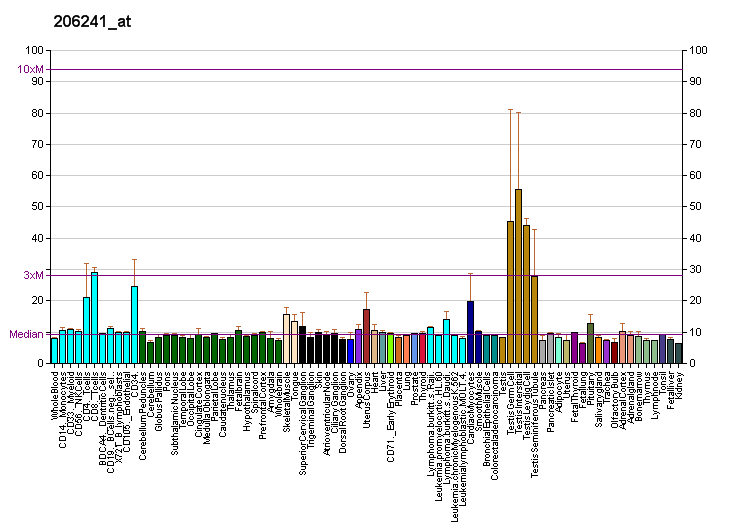
RNA expression pattern
Bgee	Human / Mouse (ortholog); Top expressed in: Achilles tendon; Brodmann area 23; middle temporal gyrus; pons; tibia; bronchial epithelial cell; endothelial cell; retinal pigment epithelium; buccal mucosa cell; germinal epithelium / n/a; More reference expression data
BioGPS	More reference expression data
Gene ontology
Molecular function	nuclear localization sequence binding; protein binding; nuclear import signal receptor activity
Cellular component	nuclear pore; nucleus; nucleoplasm; cytoplasm; cytosol
Biological process	protein transport; modulation by virus of host cellular process; NLS-bearing protein import into nucleus; protein import into nucleus; viral process
Sources:Amigo / QuickGO
Orthologs
Databases	NCBI: entry; OMA: entry
Species	Human	Mouse
Entrez	3841	n/a
Ensembl	ENSG00000196911	n/a
UniProt	O15131; Q5TD90	n/a
RefSeq (mRNA)	NM_002269	n/a
RefSeq (protein)	NP_002260; NP_001353233; NP_001353234; NP_001353235; NP_001353236 NP_001353237; NP_001353238; NP_001353239	n/a
Location (UCSC)	Chr 6: 116.68 – 116.74 Mb	n/a
PubMed search		n/a
- Wikidata
View/Edit Human

Importin subunit alpha-6 is a protein that in humans is encoded by the KPNA5 gene.

The transport of molecules between the nucleus and the cytoplasm in eukaryotic cells is mediated by the nuclear pore complex (NPC) which consists of 60-100 proteins and is probably 120 million daltons in molecular size. Small molecules (up to 70 kD) can pass through the nuclear pore by nonselective diffusion; larger molecules are transported by an active process. Most nuclear proteins contain short basic amino acid sequences known as nuclear localization signals (NLSs).

KPNA5 protein belongs to the importin alpha protein family and is thought to be involved in NLS-dependent protein import into the nucleus
