= XPOT =

Protein-coding gene in the species Homo sapiens

Identifiers
- Aliases: XPOT, XPO3, exportin for tRNA
- External IDs: OMIM: 603180; MGI: 1920442; GeneCards: XPOT

Gene location (Human)
Chr.	Chromosome 12 (human)
Band	12q14.2	Start	64,404,392 bp
Band	12q14.2	End	64,451,125 bp

Gene location (Mouse)
Chr.	Chromosome 10 (mouse)
Band	10|10 D2	Start	121,423,285 bp
Band	10|10 D2	End	121,462,237 bp
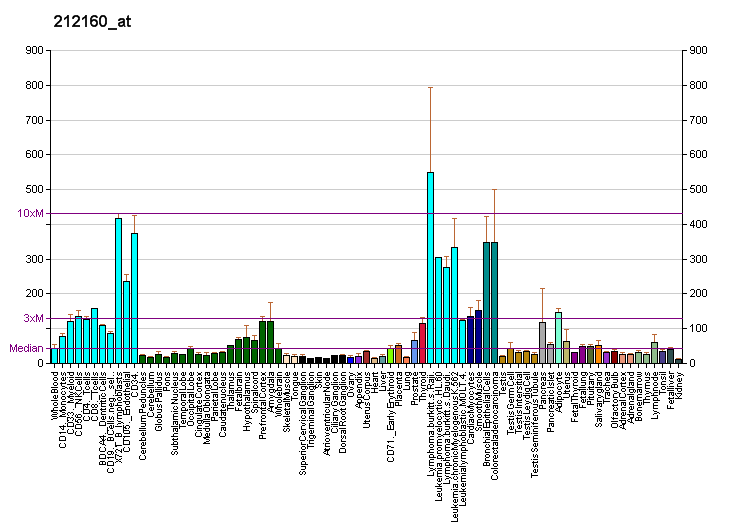
RNA expression pattern
Bgee	Human / Mouse (ortholog); Top expressed in: stromal cell of endometrium; endothelial cell; Brodmann area 23; islet of Langerhans; Achilles tendon; bone marrow cell; ventricular zone; body of pancreas; middle temporal gyrus; ganglionic eminence / Top expressed in: ureter; lacrimal gland; calvaria; renal corpuscle; fossa; condyle; parotid gland; hair follicle; substantia nigra; medullary collecting duct; More reference expression data
BioGPS	More reference expression data
Gene ontology
Molecular function	tRNA binding; RNA binding
Cellular component	cytoplasm; nuclear matrix; nuclear pore; nucleus; nucleoplasm; cytosol
Biological process	intracellular protein transport; tRNA re-export from nucleus; tRNA export from nucleus
Sources:Amigo / QuickGO
Orthologs
Databases	NCBI: entry; OMA: entry
Species	Human	Mouse
Entrez	11260	73192
Ensembl	ENSG00000184575	ENSMUSG00000034667
UniProt	O43592	Q9CRT8
RefSeq (mRNA)	NM_007235	NM_001081056; NM_001359618; NM_001401044; NM_001401045
RefSeq (protein)	NP_009166	NP_001074525; NP_001346547; NP_001387973; NP_001387974
Location (UCSC)	Chr 12: 64.4 – 64.45 Mb	Chr 10: 121.42 – 121.46 Mb
PubMed search
- Wikidata
View/Edit Human	View/Edit Mouse

Exportin-T is a protein that in humans is encoded by the XPOT gene.

This gene encodes a protein belonging to the RAN-GTPase exportin family that mediates export of tRNA from the nucleus to the cytoplasm. Translocation of tRNA to the cytoplasm occurs once exportin has bound both tRNA and GTP-bound RAN.
