= Leptomycin =

Leptomycin B

Names
- Preferred IUPAC name (2E,5S,6R,7S,9R,10E,12E,15R,16Z,18E)-17-Ethyl-6-hydroxy-3,5,7,9,11,15-hexamethyl-19-[(2S,3S)-3-methyl-6-oxo-3,6-dihydro-2H-pyran-2-yl]-8-oxononadeca-2,10,12,16,18-pentaenoic acid

Identifiers
CAS Number	87081-35-4
3D model (JSmol)	Interactive image
ChemSpider	21106330
ECHA InfoCard	100.125.530
PubChem CID	6917907
UNII	Y031I2N1EO
CompTox Dashboard (EPA)	DTXSID9036698
- InChI: InChI=1S/C33H48O6/c1-9-28(14-15-29-24(5)13-16-31(36)39-29)19-22(3)12-10-11-21(2)17-25(6)32(37)27(8)33(38)26(7)18-23(4)20-30(34)35/h10-11,13-17,19-20,22,24-27,29,33,38H,9,12,18H2,1-8H3,(H,34,35)/b11-10+,15-14+,21-17+,23-20+,28-19+/t22-,24+,25-,26+,27-,29+,33-/m1/s1 Key: YACHGFWEQXFSBS-RJXCBBHPSA-N; InChI=1/C33H48O6/c1-9-28(14-15-29-24(5)13-16-31(36)39-29)19-22(3)12-10-11-21(2)17-25(6)32(37)27(8)33(38)26(7)18-23(4)20-30(34)35/h10-11,13-17,19-20,22,24-27,29,33,38H,9,12,18H2,1-8H3,(H,34,35)/b11-10+,15-14+,21-17+,23-20+,28-19+/t22-,24+,25-,26+,27-,29+,33-/m1/s1 Key: YACHGFWEQXFSBS-RJXCBBHPBE
- SMILES: OC(=O)\C=C(/C)C[C@H](C)[C@@H](O)[C@H](C)C(=O)[C@H](C)/C=C(\C)/C=C/C[C@@H](C)\C=C(/CC)\C=C\[C@@H]1OC(=O)/C=C\[C@@H]1C

Properties
Chemical formula	C_{33}H_{48}O_{6}
Molar mass	540.741 g·mol^{−1}
Density	1.072 g/mL
- Except where otherwise noted, data are given for materials in their standard state (at 25 °C [77 °F], 100 kPa). verify (what is ?) Infobox references

Leptomycins are secondary metabolites produced by Streptomyces spp.

Leptomycin B (LMB) was originally discovered as a potent antifungal compound. Leptomycin B was found to cause cell elongation of the fission yeast Schizosaccharomyces pombe. Since then this elongation effect has been used for the bioassay of leptomycin. However, recent data shows that leptomycin causes G1 cell cycle arrest in mammalian cells and is a potent anti-tumor agent against murine experimental tumors in combination therapy.

Leptomycin B has been shown to be a potent and specific nuclear export inhibitor in humans and the fission yeast S. pombe. Leptomycin B alkylates and inhibits CRM1 (chromosomal region maintenance)/exportin 1 (XPO1), a protein required for nuclear export of proteins containing a nuclear export sequence (NES), by glycosylating a cysteine residue (cysteine 529 in S. pombe). In addition to antifungal and antibacterial activities, leptomycin B blocks the cell cycle and is a potent anti-tumor agent. At low nM concentrations, leptomycin B blocks the nuclear export of many proteins including HIV-1 Rev, MAPK/ERK, and NF-κB/IκB, and it inhibits the inactivation of p53. Leptomycin B also inhibits the export and translation of many RNAs, including COX-2 and c-Fos mRNAs, by inhibiting the export of ribonucleoproteins.

Leptomycin A (LPA) was discovered together with LMB. LMB is twice as potent as LPA.

== See also ==
- Selective inhibitor of nuclear export
