= IPO9 =

Protein-coding gene in humans

Identifiers
- Aliases: IPO9, Imp9, importin 9
- External IDs: MGI: 1918944; GeneCards: IPO9

Gene location (Human)
Chr.	Chromosome 1 (human)
Band	1q32.1	Start	201,829,149 bp
Band	1q32.1	End	201,884,291 bp

Gene location (Mouse)
Chr.	Chromosome 1 (mouse)
Band	1|1 E4	Start	135,310,050 bp
Band	1|1 E4	End	135,358,237 bp
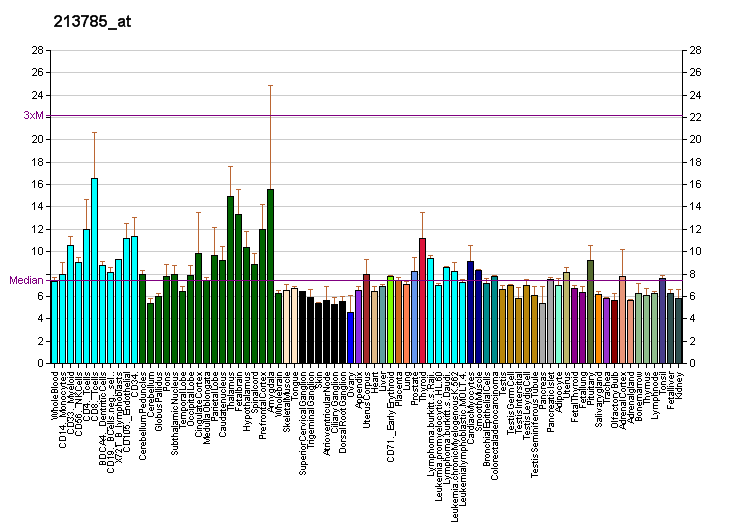

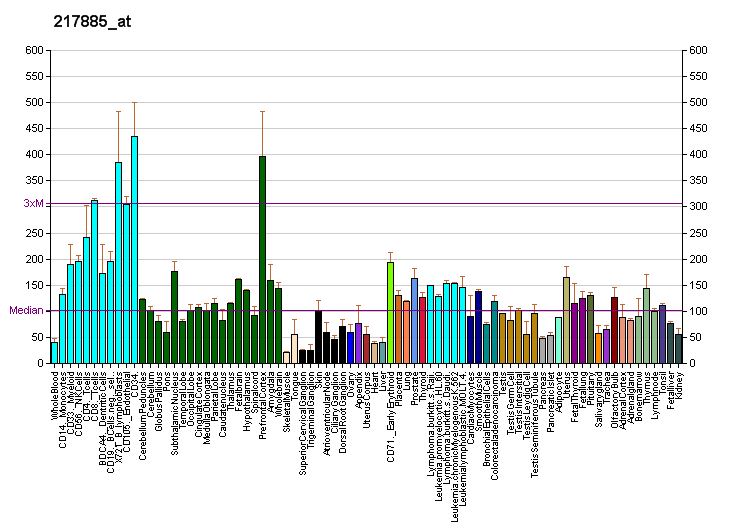
RNA expression pattern
Bgee	Human / Mouse (ortholog); Top expressed in: nipple; ventricular zone; pylorus; parietal lobe; ganglionic eminence; ventral tegmental area; postcentral gyrus; entorhinal cortex; cardia; inferior ganglion of vagus nerve / Top expressed in: neural layer of retina; hand; abdominal wall; ventricular zone; genital tubercle; superior frontal gyrus; tail of embryo; maxillary prominence; mandibular prominence; internal carotid artery; More reference expression data
BioGPS	More reference expression data
Gene ontology
Molecular function	histone binding; protein binding; nuclear import signal receptor activity
Cellular component	cytoplasm; membrane; nucleus; nuclear envelope; cytosol
Biological process	protein transport; intracellular protein transport; protein import into nucleus; transport
Sources:Amigo / QuickGO
Orthologs
Databases	NCBI: entry; OMA: entry
Species	Human	Mouse
Entrez	55705	226432
Ensembl	ENSG00000198700	ENSMUSG00000041879
UniProt	Q96P70	Q91YE6
RefSeq (mRNA)	NM_018085	NM_153774; NM_001357575; NM_001357576; NM_001357577; NM_001357578
RefSeq (protein)	NP_060555	n/a
Location (UCSC)	Chr 1: 201.83 – 201.88 Mb	Chr 1: 135.31 – 135.36 Mb
PubMed search
- Wikidata
View/Edit Human	View/Edit Mouse

Importin-9 is a protein that in humans is encoded by the IPO9 gene.
