= IPO4 =

Protein-coding gene in the species Homo sapiens

Identifiers
- Aliases: IPO4, Imp4, importin 4
- External IDs: MGI: 1923001; GeneCards: IPO4

Gene location (Mouse)
Chr.	Chromosome 14 (mouse)
Band	14 C3|14 28.19 cM	Start	55,862,857 bp
Band	14 C3|14 28.19 cM	End	55,873,414 bp
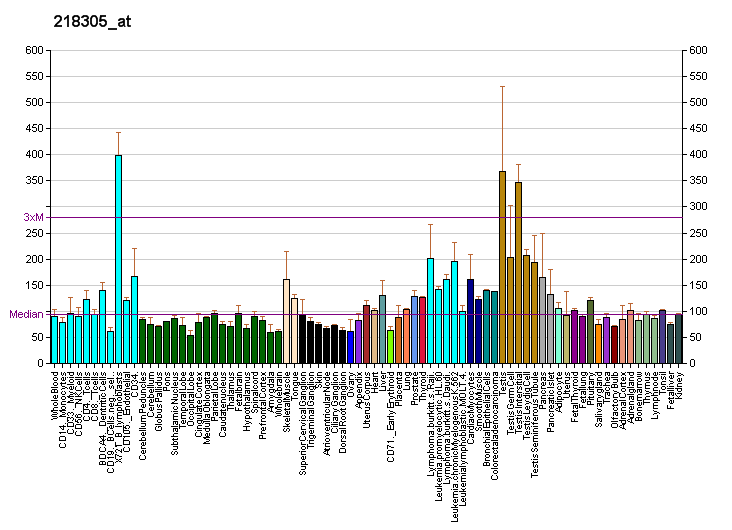
RNA expression pattern
Bgee	Human / Mouse (ortholog); Top expressed in: body of pancreas; gastrocnemius muscle; right uterine tube; right adrenal gland; sural nerve; anterior pituitary; left adrenal gland; kidney; skeletal muscle tissue; bone marrow cell / Top expressed in: internal carotid artery; external carotid artery; seminiferous tubule; fossa; Gonadal ridge; condyle; vas deferens; morula; arcuate nucleus; paraventricular nucleus of hypothalamus; More reference expression data
BioGPS	More reference expression data
Gene ontology
Molecular function	protein binding; nuclear localization sequence binding
Cellular component	cytoplasm; nuclear membrane; nuclear pore; membrane; nuclear periphery; nucleus; protein-containing complex
Biological process	protein transport; DNA replication-dependent chromatin assembly; intracellular protein transport; ribosomal protein import into nucleus; NLS-bearing protein import into nucleus; transport; protein import into nucleus
Sources:Amigo / QuickGO
Orthologs
Databases	NCBI: entry
Species	Human	Mouse
Entrez	79711	75751
Ensembl	n/a	ENSMUSG00000002319
UniProt	Q8TEX9	Q8VI75
RefSeq (mRNA)	NM_024658	NM_024267; NM_001360078
RefSeq (protein)	NP_078934	NP_077229; NP_001347007
Location (UCSC)	n/a	Chr 14: 55.86 – 55.87 Mb
PubMed search
- Wikidata
View/Edit Human	View/Edit Mouse

Importin-4 is a protein that in humans is encoded by the IPO4 gene.
