= Nuclear transport =

Mechanism of molecules moving across the nuclear membrane

The nuclear pore complex is important for the transport of molecules across the nuclear membrane

Nuclear transport refers to the mechanisms by which molecules move across the nuclear membrane of a cell's nucleus. The entry and exit of large molecules from the nucleus is tightly controlled by nuclear pore complexes (NPCs). Although small molecules can enter the nucleus without regulation, macromolecules such as RNA and proteins require association with transport factors known as nuclear transport receptors, like karyopherins called importins to enter the nucleus and exportins to exit.

== Nuclear import ==
Proteins that must be imported to the nucleus from the cytoplasm carry nuclear localization signals (NLSs) that are bound by importins. An NLS is a sequence of amino acids that acts as a tag. They are most commonly hydrophilic sequences containing lysine and arginine residues, although diverse NLS sequences have been documented. Proteins, transfer RNA, and assembled ribosomal subunits are exported from the nucleus due to association with exportins, which bind signaling sequences called nuclear export signals (NES). The ability of both importins and exportins to transport their cargo is regulated by the Ran small G-protein.

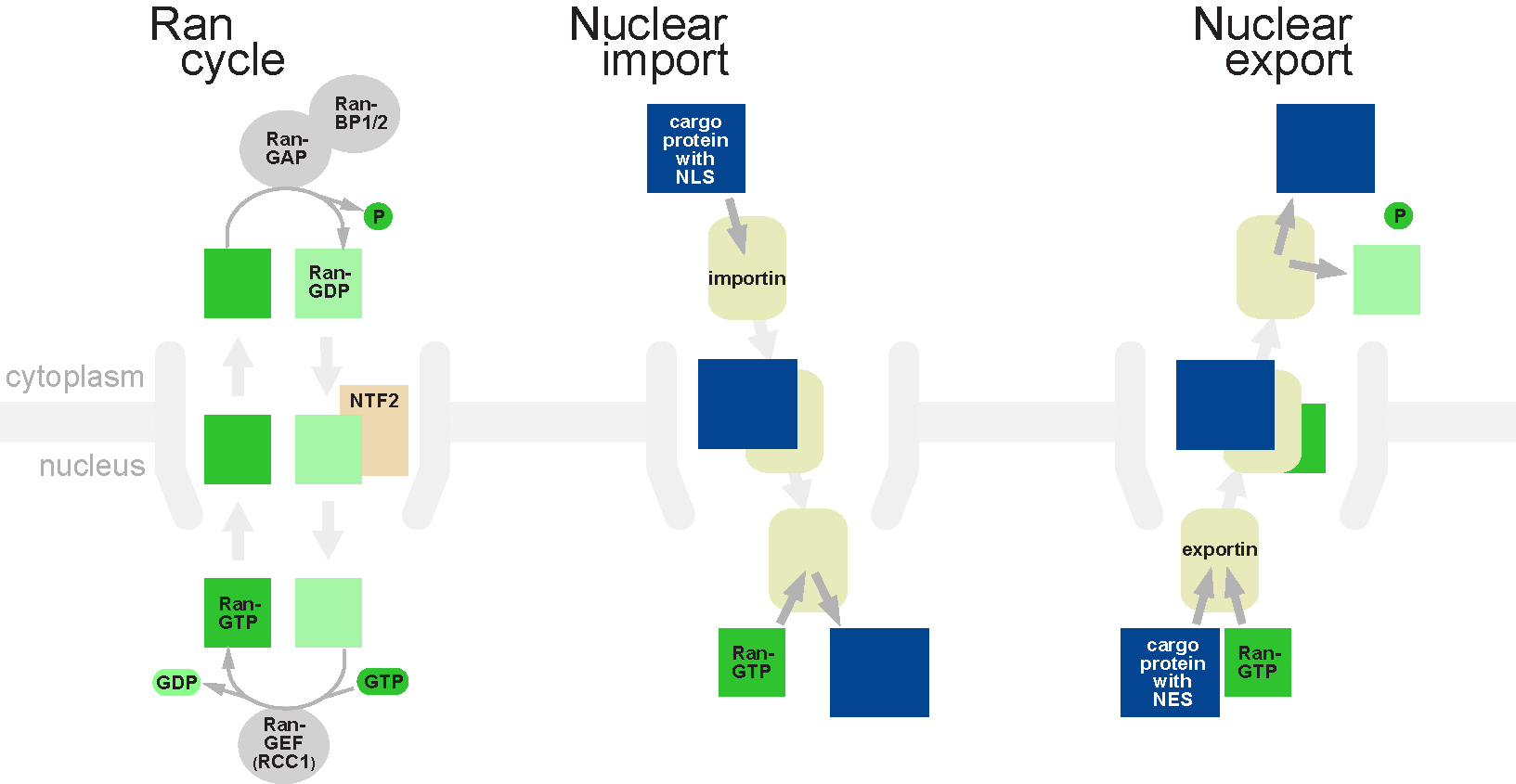
Macromolecules, such as RNA and proteins, are actively transported across the nuclear membrane in a process called the Ran-GTP nuclear transport cycle.

G proteins are GTPase enzymes that bind to a molecule called guanosine triphosphate (GTP) which they then hydrolyze to create guanosine diphosphate (GDP) and release energy. The RAN enzymes exist in two nucleotide-bound forms: GDP-bound and GTP-bound. In its GTP-bound state, Ran is capable of binding importins and exportins. Importins release cargo upon binding to RanGTP, while exportins must bind RanGTP to form a ternary complex with their export cargo. The dominant nucleotide binding state of Ran depends on whether it is located in the nucleus (RanGTP) or the cytoplasm (RanGDP).

== Nuclear export ==
Nuclear export roughly reverses the import process; in the nucleus, the exportin binds the cargo and Ran-GTP and diffuses through the pore to the cytoplasm, where the complex dissociates. Ran-GTP binds GAP and hydrolyzes GTP, and the resulting Ran-GDP complex is restored to the nucleus where it exchanges its bound ligand for GTP. Hence, whereas importins depend on RanGTP to dissociate from their cargo, exportins require RanGTP in order to bind to their cargo.

A specialized mRNA exporter protein moves mature mRNA to the cytoplasm after post-transcriptional modification is complete. This translocation process is actively dependent on the Ran protein, although the specific mechanism is not yet well understood. Some particularly commonly transcribed genes are physically located near nuclear pores to facilitate the translocation process.

Export of tRNA is also dependent on the various modifications it undergoes, thus preventing export of improperly functioning tRNA. This quality control mechanism is important due to tRNA's central role in translation, where it is involved in adding amino acids to a growing peptide chain. The tRNA exporter in vertebrates is called exportin-t. Exportin-t binds directly to its tRNA cargo in the nucleus, a process promoted by the presence of RanGTP. Mutations that affect tRNA's structure inhibit its ability to bind to exportin-t, and consequentially, to be exported, providing the cell with another quality control step. As described above, once the complex has crossed the envelope it dissociates and releases the tRNA cargo into the cytosol.

== Protein shuttling ==
Many proteins are known to have both NESs and NLSs and thus shuttle constantly between the nucleus and the cytosol. In certain cases one of these steps (i.e., nuclear import or nuclear export) is regulated, often by post-translational modifications.

Nuclear import limits the propagation of large proteins expressed in skeletal muscle fibers and possibly other syncytial tissues, maintaining localized gene expression in certain nuclei. Combining both NESs and NLSs promotes propagation of large proteins to more distant nuclei in multinucleated muscle fibers.

Protein shuttling can be assessed using a heterokaryon fusion assay.
