= IPO11 =

Protein-coding gene in the species Homo sapiens

Identifiers
- Aliases: IPO11, RanBP11, importin 11
- External IDs: OMIM: 610889; MGI: 2442377; GeneCards: IPO11

Gene location (Human)
Chr.	Chromosome 5 (human)
Band	5q12.1	Start	62,403,972 bp
Band	5q12.1	End	62,628,582 bp

Gene location (Mouse)
Chr.	Chromosome 13 (mouse)
Band	13|13 D1- D2.1	Start	106,930,947 bp
Band	13|13 D1- D2.1	End	107,073,466 bp
RNA expression pattern
Bgee	Human / Mouse (ortholog); Top expressed in: gonad; testicle; epithelium of colon; bronchial epithelial cell; ventricular zone; right testis; left testis; sperm; Achilles tendon; olfactory zone of nasal mucosa / Top expressed in: tail of embryo; genital tubercle; blood; primitive streak; somite; spermatocyte; ventricular zone; utricle; epiblast; cumulus cell; More reference expression data
BioGPS	n/a
Gene ontology
Molecular function	protein binding; nuclear import signal receptor activity
Cellular component	cytoplasm; fibrillar center; nucleus; nuclear envelope; cytosol
Biological process	protein transport; intracellular protein transport; ribosomal protein import into nucleus; protein import into nucleus
Sources:Amigo / QuickGO
Orthologs
Databases	NCBI: entry; OMA: entry
Species	Human	Mouse
Entrez	51194	76582
Ensembl	ENSG00000086200	ENSMUSG00000042590
UniProt	Q9UI26	Q8K2V6
RefSeq (mRNA)	NM_016338; NM_001134779	NM_029665; NM_001360897; NM_175202
RefSeq (protein)	NP_001128251; NP_057422	NP_083941; NP_001347826
Location (UCSC)	Chr 5: 62.4 – 62.63 Mb	Chr 13: 106.93 – 107.07 Mb
PubMed search
- Wikidata
View/Edit Human	View/Edit Mouse

Importin-11 is a protein that in humans is encoded by the IPO11 gene.
