= Truncation (disambiguation) =

Truncation is the term used for limiting the number of digits right of the decimal point by discarding the least significant ones.

Truncation may also refer to:

== Mathematics ==
- Truncation (statistics) refers to measurements which have been cut off at some value
- Truncation (numerical analysis) refers to truncating an infinite sum by a finite one
- Truncation (geometry) is the removal of one or more parts, as for example in truncated cube
- Propositional truncation, a type former which truncates a type down to a mere proposition

== Computer science ==
- Data truncation, an event that occurs when a file or other data is stored in a location too small to accommodate its entire length
- Truncate (SQL), a command in the SQL data manipulation language to quickly remove all data from a table

== Biology ==
- Truncate, a leaf shape
- Truncated protein, a protein shortened by a mutation which specifically induces premature termination of messenger RNA translation

== Other uses ==
- Cheque truncation, the conversion of physical cheques into electronic form for transmission to the paying bank
- Clipping (morphology), the word formation process which consists in the reduction of a word to one of its parts
- Truncation (archaeology), also 'cut', the removal of archaeological deposits from an archaeological record
