= IPO8 =

Proteine

Identifiers
- Aliases: IPO8, RANBP8, importin 8, VISS
- External IDs: OMIM: 605600; MGI: 2444611; GeneCards: IPO8

Gene location (Human)
Chr.	Chromosome 12 (human)
Band	12p11.21	Start	30,628,988 bp
Band	12p11.21	End	30,695,869 bp

Gene location (Mouse)
Chr.	Chromosome 6 (mouse)
Band	6|6 G3	Start	148,770,683 bp
Band	6|6 G3	End	148,831,467 bp
RNA expression pattern
Bgee	Human / Mouse (ortholog); Top expressed in: secondary oocyte; tendon of biceps brachii; internal globus pallidus; skin of hip; mucosa of sigmoid colon; Achilles tendon; buccal mucosa cell; superficial temporal artery; seminal vesicula; jejunal mucosa / Top expressed in: secondary oocyte; zygote; primary oocyte; cumulus cell; epithelium of lens; medial vestibular nucleus; central gray substance of midbrain; pituitary gland; superior cervical ganglion; left lobe of liver; More reference expression data
BioGPS	n/a
Gene ontology
Molecular function	protein binding
Cellular component	cytoplasm; nucleus; nucleoplasm; nuclear envelope; cytosol
Biological process	protein transport; intracellular protein transport; signal transduction; regulation of gene silencing by miRNA; protein import into nucleus
Sources:Amigo / QuickGO
Orthologs
Databases	NCBI: entry; OMA: entry
Species	Human	Mouse
Entrez	10526	320727
Ensembl	ENSG00000133704	ENSMUSG00000040029
UniProt	O15397	Q7TMY7
RefSeq (mRNA)	NM_001190995; NM_006390	NM_001081113
RefSeq (protein)	NP_001177924; NP_006381	NP_001074582
Location (UCSC)	Chr 12: 30.63 – 30.7 Mb	Chr 6: 148.77 – 148.83 Mb
PubMed search
- Wikidata
View/Edit Human	View/Edit Mouse

Importin 8 is a protein that in humans is encoded by the IPO8 gene.

== Function ==
The importin-alpha/beta complex and the GTPase Ran mediate nuclear import of proteins with a classical nuclear localization signal. The protein encoded by this gene is a member of a class of approximately 20 potential Ran targets that share a sequence motif related to the Ran-binding site of importin-beta. This protein binds to the nuclear pore complex and, along with RanGTP and RANBP1, inhibits the GAP stimulation of the Ran GTPase. Alternatively spliced transcript variants encoding different isoforms have been found for this gene. [provided by RefSeq, Jul 2010].
