= Karyopherin =

Proteins involved in nucleocytoplasmic transport

Karyopherins are transport proteins involved in the nuclear transport of moving molecules between the cytoplasm and the nucleus of a eukaryotic cell. (The inside of the nucleus is called the karyoplasm (or nucleoplasm). Generally, karyopherin-mediated transport occurs through nuclear pores which act as gateways into and out of the nucleus. Macromolecular proteins require karyopherins to traverse the nuclear pore.

Karyopherins can act as importins helping proteins to enter the nucleus, or as exportins helping proteins to exit the nucleus. They belong to the nuclear pore complex family in the transporter classification database (TCDB). Energy for transport is derived from the Ran gradient.

Upon stress, several karyopherins stop shuttling between the nucleus and the cytoplasm and are sequestered in stress granules, cytoplasmic aggregates of ribonucleoprotein complexes.

== Importin beta ==
Importin beta is a variety of karyopherin that facilitates the transport of cargo proteins into the nucleus. First, it is binding importin alpha – another type of karyopherin that binds the cargo protein in the cytoplasm—before the cargo protein is imported into the nucleus through the nuclear pore using energy derived from the Ran gradient. Once inside the nucleus, the cargo dissociates from the karyopherins.

Importin beta can also carry proteins into the nucleus without the aid of the importin alpha adapter protein.

== Human genes in the karyopherin family ==
- KPNA1
- KPNA2
- KPNA3
- KPNA4
- KPNA5
- KPNA6
- KPNB1
- CRM1

== Additional images ==
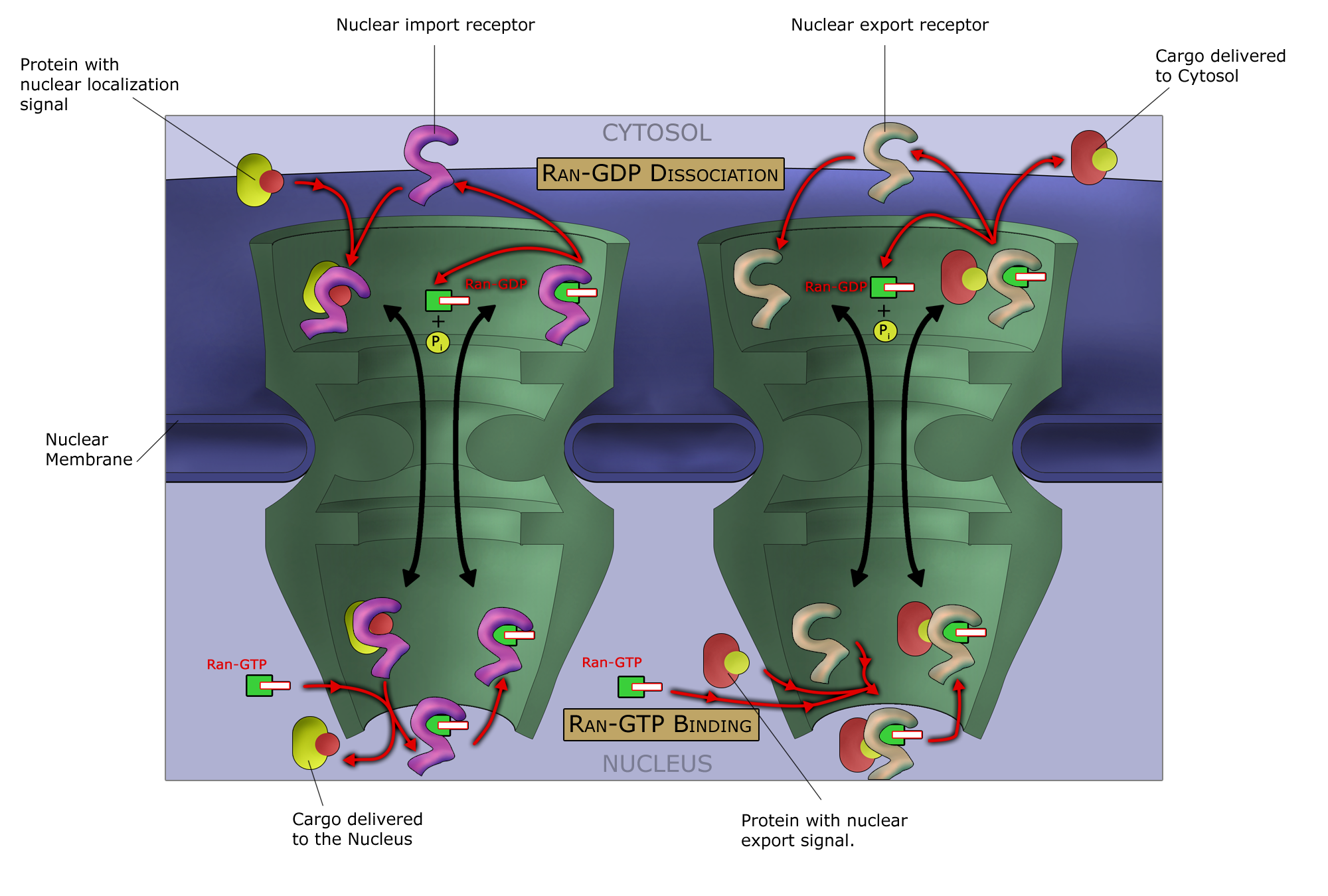
The Ran-GTP cycle
