= Importin subunit alpha-4 =

Protein-coding gene in the species Homo sapiens

KPNA3

Identifiers
- Aliases: KPNA3, IPOA4, SRP1, SRP1gamma, SRP4, hSRP1, karyopherin subunit alpha 3
- External IDs: OMIM: 601892; MGI: 1100863; GeneCards: KPNA3

Gene location (Human)
Chr.	Chromosome 13 (human)
Band	13q14.2	Start	49,699,320 bp
Band	13q14.2	End	49,792,682 bp

Gene location (Mouse)
Chr.	Chromosome 14 (mouse)
Band	14|14 D1	Start	61,602,660 bp
Band	14|14 D1	End	61,677,323 bp
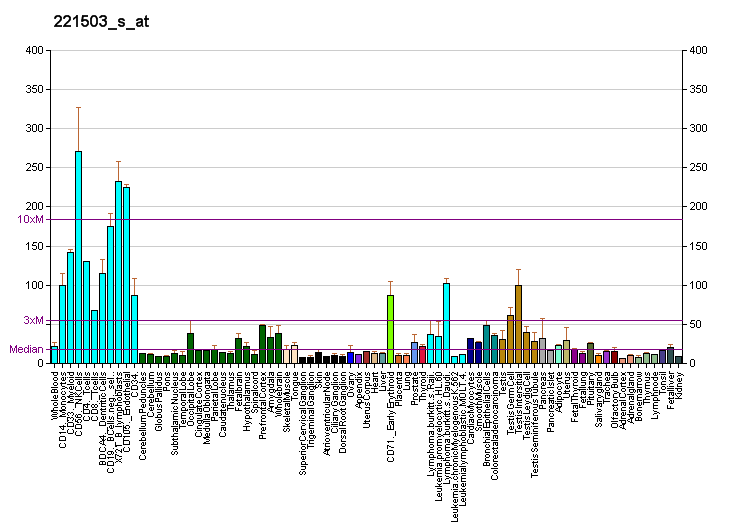

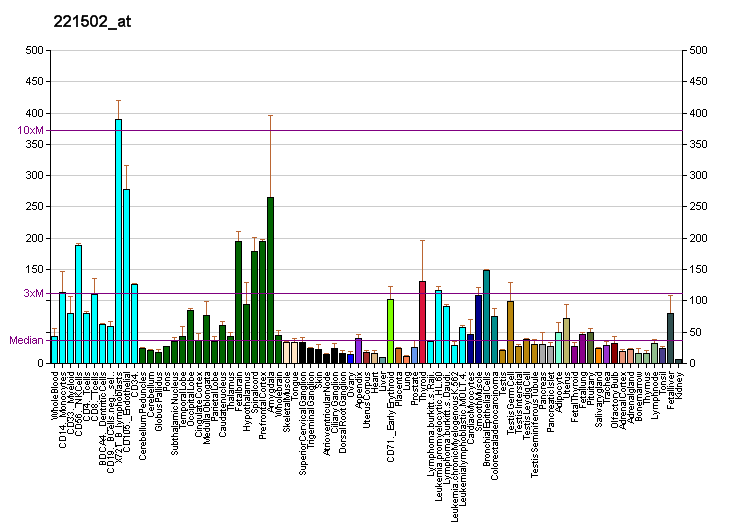
RNA expression pattern
Bgee	Human / Mouse (ortholog); Top expressed in: biceps brachii; Skeletal muscle tissue of rectus abdominis; Skeletal muscle tissue of biceps brachii; deltoid muscle; tibialis anterior muscle; vastus lateralis muscle; glutes; secondary oocyte; triceps brachii muscle; thoracic diaphragm / Top expressed in: extensor digitorum longus muscle; plantaris muscle; zygote; secondary oocyte; pineal gland; triceps brachii muscle; tail of embryo; vastus lateralis muscle; temporal muscle; triceps surae; More reference expression data
BioGPS	More reference expression data
Gene ontology
Molecular function	protein C-terminus binding; protein binding; nuclear localization sequence binding; nuclear import signal receptor activity
Cellular component	cytoplasm; cytosol; nuclear pore; nucleus; nucleoplasm; host cell
Biological process	protein transport; viral entry into host cell; viral process; viral penetration into host nucleus; protein import into nucleus; NLS-bearing protein import into nucleus; modulation by virus of host cellular process; protein-containing complex assembly
Sources:Amigo / QuickGO
Orthologs
Databases	NCBI: entry; OMA: entry
Species	Human	Mouse
Entrez	3839	16648
Ensembl	ENSG00000102753	ENSMUSG00000021929
UniProt	O00505	O35344
RefSeq (mRNA)	NM_002267	NM_008466
RefSeq (protein)	NP_002258	NP_032492
Location (UCSC)	Chr 13: 49.7 – 49.79 Mb	Chr 14: 61.6 – 61.68 Mb
PubMed search
- Wikidata
View/Edit Human	View/Edit Mouse

Importin subunit alpha-4 also known as karyopherin subunit alpha-3 is a protein that in humans is encoded by the KPNA3 gene.

The transport of molecules between the nucleus and the cytoplasm in eukaryotic cells is mediated by the nuclear pore complex (NPC) which consists of 60–100 proteins and is probably 120 million daltons in molecular size. Small molecules (up to 70 kD) can pass through the nuclear pore by nonselective diffusion; larger molecules are transported by an active process. Most nuclear proteins contain short basic amino acid sequences known as nuclear localization signals (NLSs). KPNA3, encodes a protein similar to certain nuclear transport proteins of Xenopus and human. The predicted amino acid sequence shows similarity to Xenopus importin, yeast SRP1, and human RCH1 (KPNA2), respectively. The similarities among these proteins suggests that karyopherin alpha-3 may be involved in the nuclear transport system.

== Interactions ==
KPNA3 has been shown to interact with KPNB1.
