= Importin subunit alpha-5 =

Protein-coding gene in the species Homo sapiens

KPNA1
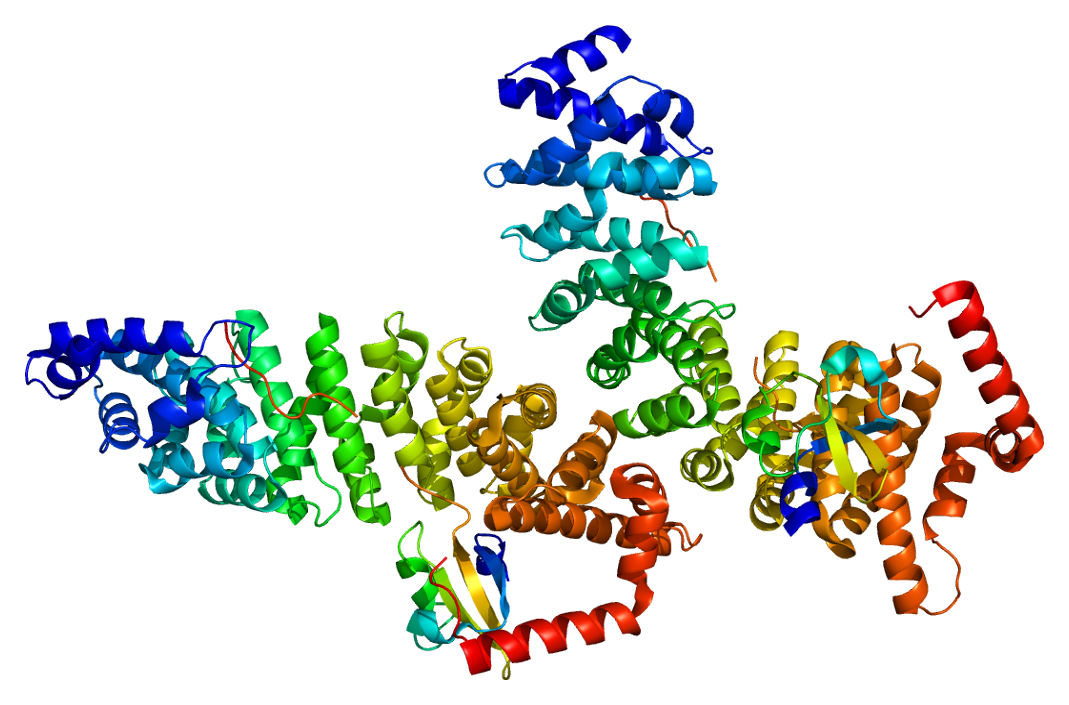

Identifiers
- Aliases: KPNA1, IPOA5, NPI-1, RCH2, SRP1, Importin, Karyopherin alpha 1, karyopherin subunit alpha 1
- External IDs: OMIM: 600686; MGI: 103560; GeneCards: KPNA1
Available structures
PDB	Ortholog search: PDBe RCSB
PDB	List of PDB id codes 2JDQ, 3TJ3, 4B18

Gene location (Human)
Chr.	Chromosome 3 (human)
Band	3q21.1	Start	122,421,902 bp
Band	3q21.1	End	122,514,945 bp

Gene location (Mouse)
Chr.	Chromosome 16 (mouse)
Band	16|16 B3	Start	35,799,120 bp
Band	16|16 B3	End	35,857,501 bp
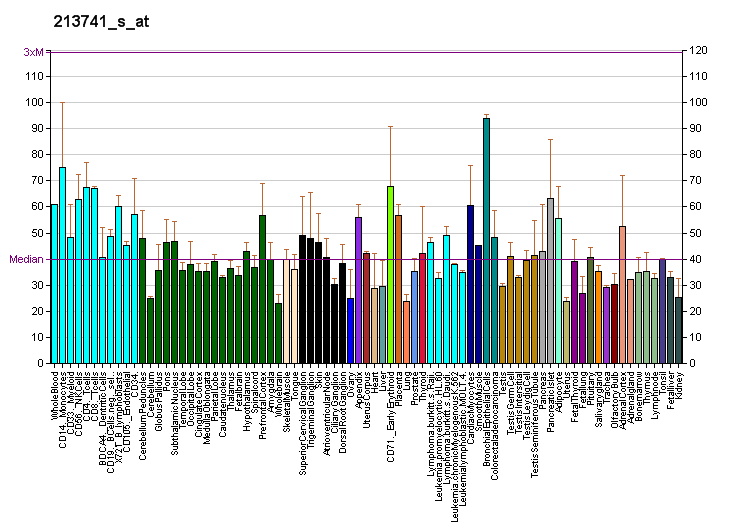

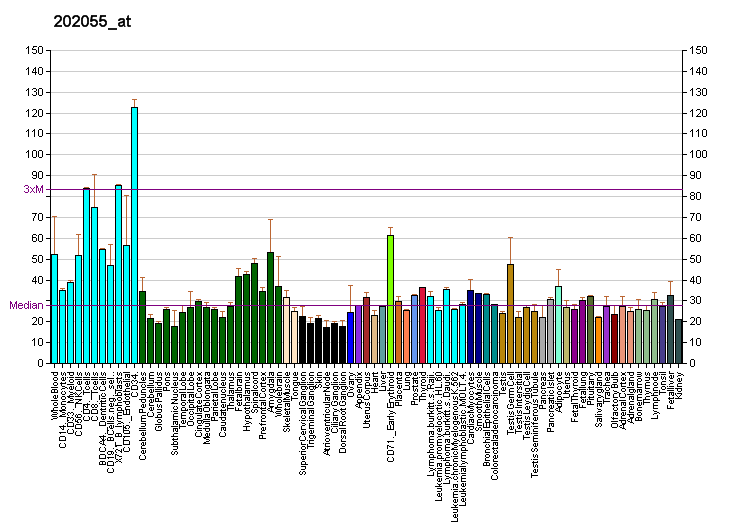

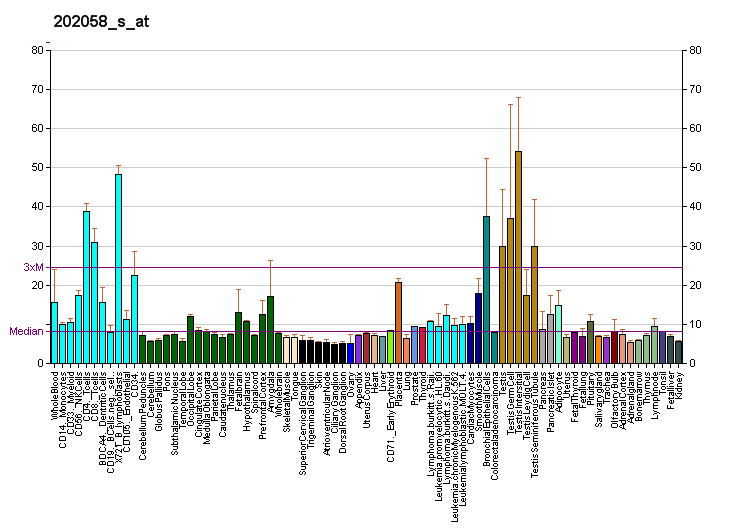
RNA expression pattern
Bgee	Human / Mouse (ortholog); Top expressed in: glutes; biceps brachii; sural nerve; deltoid muscle; gastrocnemius muscle; endothelial cell; Skeletal muscle tissue of biceps brachii; Skeletal muscle tissue of rectus abdominis; triceps brachii muscle; tibialis anterior muscle / Top expressed in: triceps brachii muscle; otic vesicle; gastrocnemius muscle; vastus lateralis muscle; muscle of thigh; extensor digitorum longus muscle; medial head of gastrocnemius muscle; temporal muscle; blood; sternocleidomastoid muscle; More reference expression data
BioGPS	More reference expression data
Gene ontology
Molecular function	protein binding; nuclear localization sequence binding; nuclear import signal receptor activity
Cellular component	nuclear pore; nucleoplasm; dendrite; nucleus; cytoplasm; cytosol; host cell; postsynaptic density; glutamatergic synapse
Biological process	regulation of DNA recombination; intracellular transport of virus; apoptotic DNA fragmentation; protein import into nucleus; protein transport; modulation by virus of host cellular process; NLS-bearing protein import into nucleus; viral process; postsynapse to nucleus signaling pathway
Sources:Amigo / QuickGO
Orthologs
Databases	NCBI: entry; OMA: entry
Species	Human	Mouse
Entrez	3836	16646
Ensembl	ENSG00000114030	ENSMUSG00000022905
UniProt	P52294	Q60960
RefSeq (mRNA)	NM_002264	NM_008465
RefSeq (protein)	NP_002255	NP_032491
Location (UCSC)	Chr 3: 122.42 – 122.51 Mb	Chr 16: 35.8 – 35.86 Mb
PubMed search
- Wikidata
View/Edit Human	View/Edit Mouse

Importin subunit alpha-5 is a protein that in humans is encoded by the KPNA1 gene.

== Interactions ==
Importin subunit alpha-5 has been shown to interact with KPNB1 and UBR5.
