= Importin subunit alpha-7 =

Protein found in humans

KPNA6

Identifiers
- Aliases: KPNA6, IPOA7, KPNA7, karyopherin subunit alpha 6
- External IDs: OMIM: 610563; MGI: 1100836; GeneCards: KPNA6
Available structures
| PDB | Ortholog search: PDBe RCSB |
| PDB | List of PDB id codes 4UAD |

Gene location (Human)
| Chr. | Chromosome 1 (human) |
| Band | 1p35.2 | Start | 32,108,056 bp |
| Band | 1p35.2 | End | 32,176,563 bp |

Gene location (Mouse)
| Chr. | Chromosome 4 (mouse) |
| Band | 4|4 D2.2 | Start | 129,537,773 bp |
| Band | 4|4 D2.2 | End | 129,566,560 bp |
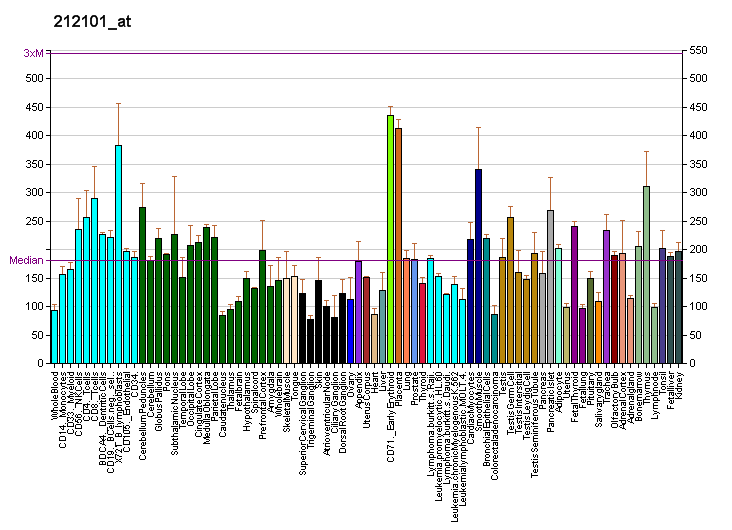

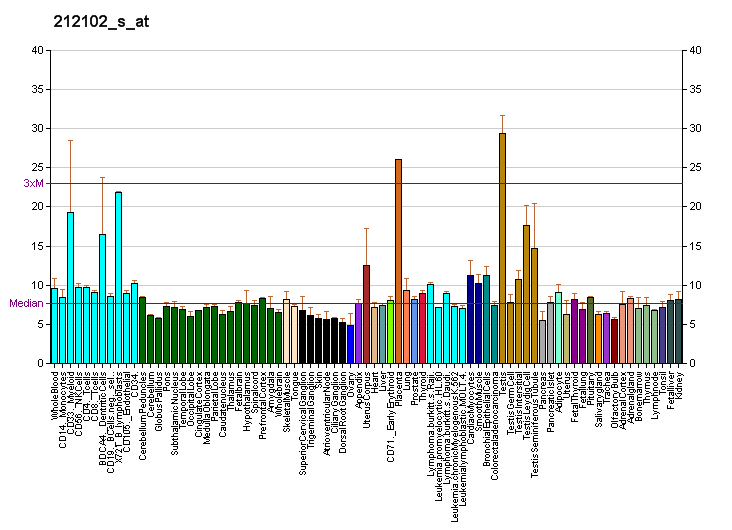
RNA expression pattern
| Bgee | Human / Mouse (ortholog); Top expressed in: buccal mucosa cell; nipple; oocyte; olfactory bulb; beta cell; secondary oocyte; vena cava; saphenous vein; Skeletal muscle tissue of rectus abdominis; superior surface of tongue / Top expressed in: spermatid; spermatocyte; cumulus cell; saccule; otic placode; seminiferous tubule; substantia nigra; retinal pigment epithelium; Epithelium of choroid plexus; Paneth cell; More reference expression data |
| BioGPS | More reference expression data |
Gene ontology
| Molecular function | protein binding; nuclear localization sequence binding; nuclear import signal receptor activity |
| Cellular component | cytoplasm; cytosol; nuclear pore; membrane; nucleus; nucleoplasm; host cell |
| Biological process | protein transport; maternal process involved in female pregnancy; positive regulation of transcription by RNA polymerase II; protein import into nucleus; NLS-bearing protein import into nucleus; transport; entry of viral genome into host nucleus through nuclear pore complex via importin; positive regulation of cytokine production involved in inflammatory response; positive regulation of viral life cycle |
Sources:Amigo / QuickGO
Orthologs
| Databases | NCBI: entry; OMA: entry |
| Species | Human | Mouse |
| Entrez | 23633 | 16650 |
| Ensembl | ENSG00000025800 | ENSMUSG00000003731 |
| UniProt | O60684 | O35345 |
| RefSeq (mRNA) | NM_012316 | NM_008468 |
| RefSeq (protein) | NP_036448 | NP_032494 |
| Location (UCSC) | Chr 1: 32.11 – 32.18 Mb | Chr 4: 129.54 – 129.57 Mb |
| PubMed search |
- Wikidata
| View/Edit Human | View/Edit Mouse |

Importin subunit alpha-7 is a protein that in humans is encoded by the KPNA6 gene.

Nucleocytoplasmic transport, a signal- and energy-dependent process, takes place through nuclear pore complexes embedded in the nuclear envelope. The import of proteins containing a nuclear localization signal (NLS) requires the NLS import receptor, a heterodimer of importin alpha and beta subunits also known as karyopherins. Importin alpha binds the NLS-containing cargo in the cytoplasm and importin beta docks the complex at the cytoplasmic side of the nuclear pore complex. In the presence of nucleoside triphosphates and the small GTP binding protein Ran, the complex moves into the nuclear pore complex and the importin subunits dissociate. Importin alpha enters the nucleoplasm with its passenger protein and importin beta remains at the pore. The protein encoded by this gene is a member of the importin alpha family.
