= Nuclear pore complex =

Openings in nuclear envelope of eukaryotic cells

- Diagram of the human cell nucleus with nuclear pores.

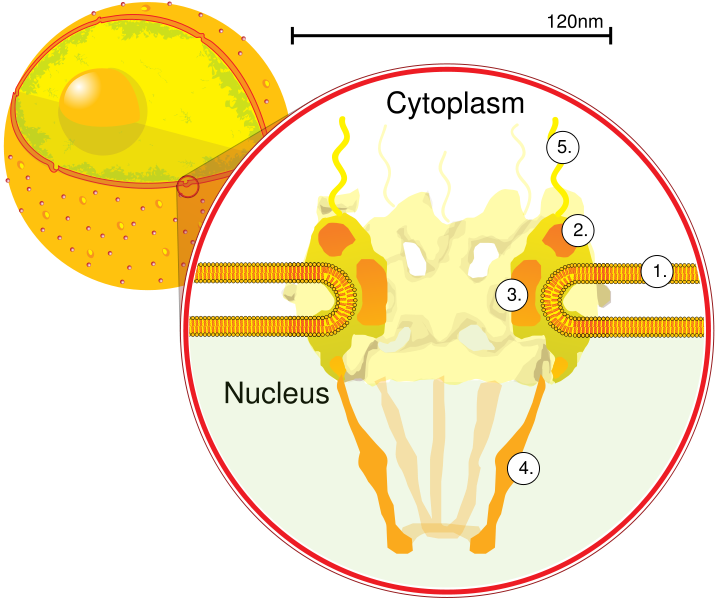
- Schematic diagram of a nuclear pore complex within the nuclear envelope (1) with the outer ring (2), spokes (3), basket (4), and filaments (5).

Details

Identifiers
- Latin: porus nuclearis
- MeSH: D022022
- TH: H1.00.01.2.01005
- FMA: 63148

The nuclear pore complex (NPC) is a large protein complex giving rise to the nuclear pore. A great number of nuclear pores are studded throughout the nuclear envelope that surrounds the eukaryote cell nucleus. The pores enable the nuclear transport of macromolecules between the nucleoplasm of the nucleus and the cytoplasm of the cell. Small molecules can easily diffuse through the pores. Nuclear transport includes the transportation of RNA and ribosomal proteins from the nucleus to the cytoplasm, and the transport of proteins (such as DNA polymerase and lamins), carbohydrates, signaling molecules, and lipids into the nucleus. Each nuclear pore complex can actively mediate up to 1000 translocations per second.

The nuclear pore complex consists predominantly of a family of proteins known as nucleoporins (Nups). Each pore complex in the human cell nucleus is composed of about 1,000 individual protein molecules, from an evolutionarily conserved set of 35 distinct nucleoporins. The conserved sequences that code for nucleoporins regulate molecular transport through the nuclear pore. Nucleoporin-mediated transport does not entail direct energy expenditure but instead relies on concentration gradients associated with the RAN cycle (Ras-related nuclear protein cycle). In 2022 around 90% of the structure of the human NPC was elucidated in an open and a closed conformation, and published in a special issue of Science, featured on the cover. In 2024 the structure of the nuclear basket was solved, finalising the completion of the structure of the nuclear pore complex.

About half of the nucleoporins encompass solenoid protein domains, such as alpha solenoids or beta-propeller folds, and occasionally both as separate structural domains. Conversely, the remaining nucleoporins exhibit characteristics of "natively unfolded" or intrinsically disordered proteins, characterized by high flexibility and a lack of ordered tertiary structure. These disordered proteins, referred to as FG nucleoporins (FG-Nups), contain multiple phenylalanine–glycine repeats (FG repeats) in their amino acid sequences. FG-Nups is one of three main types of nucleoporins found in the NPC. The other two are the transmembrane Nups and the scaffold Nups. The transmembrane Nups are made up of transmembrane alpha helices and play a vital part in anchoring the NPC to the nuclear envelope. The scaffold Nups are made up of alpha solenoid and beta-propeller folds, and create the structural framework of NPCs.

The count of nuclear pore complexes varies across cell types and different stages of the cell's life cycle, with approximately 2,000 NPCs typically found in a vertebrate cell nucleus. The human nuclear pore complex is a substantial structure, with a molecular weight of 120 megadaltons (MDa). Each NPC comprises eight protein subunits encircling the actual pore, forming the outer ring. Additionally, these subunits project a spoke-shaped protein over the pore channel. The central region of the pore may exhibit a plug-like structure; however, its precise nature remains unknown, and it is yet undetermined whether it represents an actual plug or merely cargo transiently caught in transit.

== Structure ==
The nuclear pore complex (NPC) is a crucial cellular structure with a diameter of approximately 120 nanometers in vertebrates. Its channel fuses the inner and outer membranes of the nuclear envelope and varies from 5.2 nanometers in humans to 10.7 nm in the frog Xenopus laevis, with a depth of roughly 45 nm. Additionally, mRNA, being single-stranded, has a thickness ranging from 0.5 to 1 nm. The mammalian NPC has a molecular mass of about 124 MDa, comprising approximately 30 distinct protein components, each in multiple copies, and about 800 nucleoporins organized into distinct NPC subcomplexes. Conversely, the yeast Saccharomyces cerevisiae possesses a smaller mass, estimated at only 66 MDa.

== Nuclear transport ==
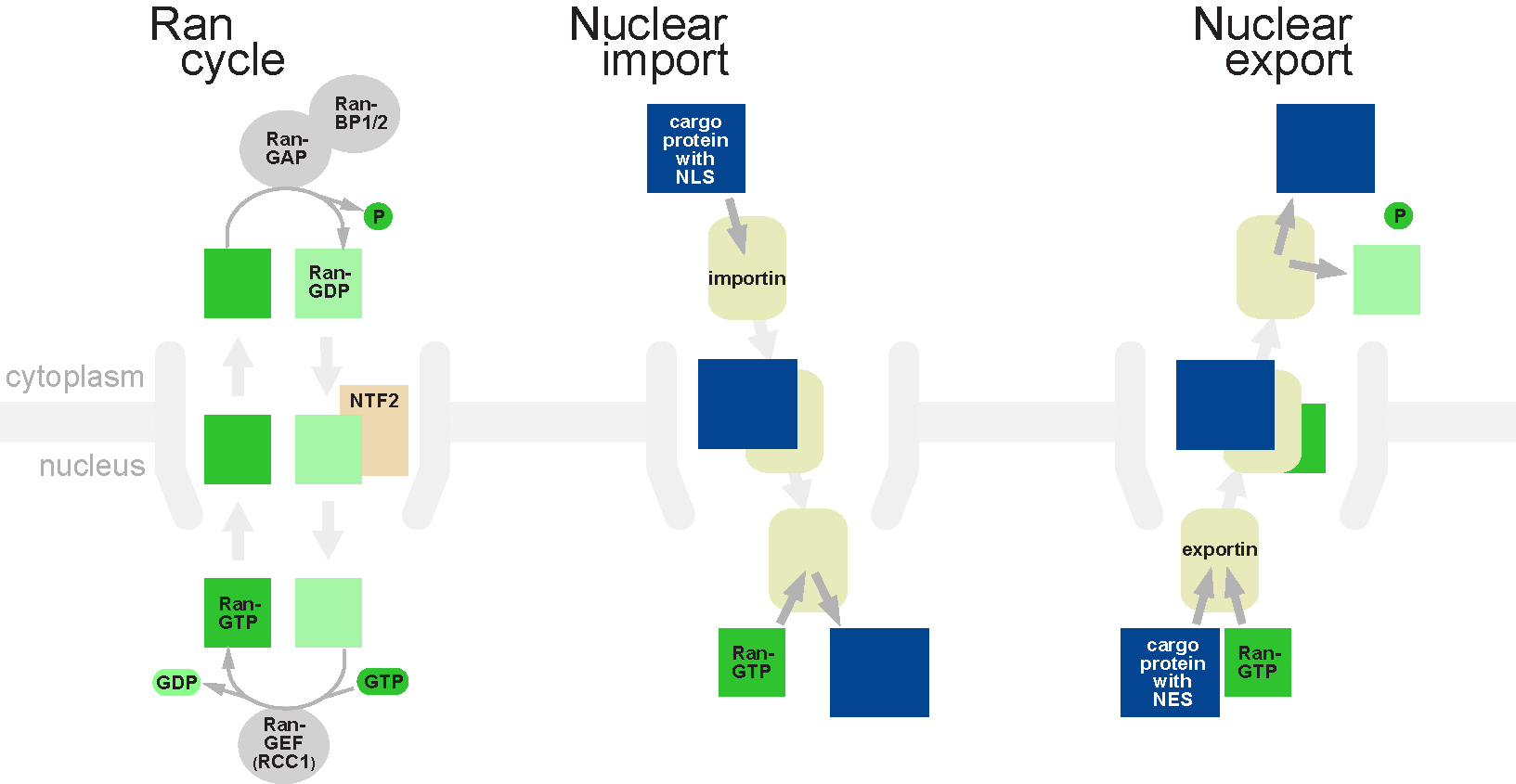
The Ran-GTP cycle, which drives the import and export of RNA and proteins through the nuclear protein complex.

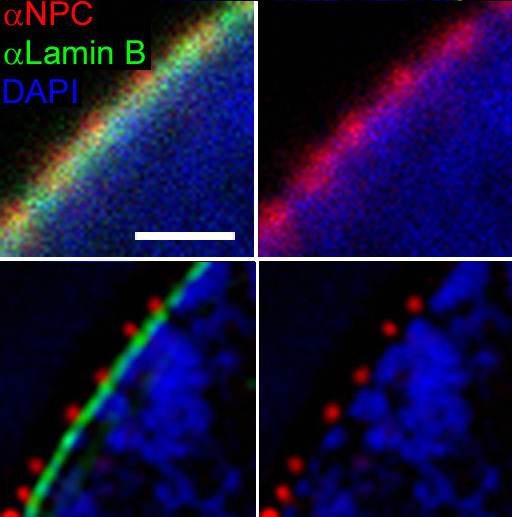
Scanning and illumination microscopy of nuclear pores, lamina, and chromatin.

The nuclear pore complex (NPC) serves as a highly regulated gateway for the transport of molecules between the nucleus and the cytoplasm. This intricate system enables the selective passage for molecules including proteins, RNA, and signaling molecules, ensuring proper cellular function and homeostasis. Small molecules such as proteins, water, and ions can diffuse through NPCs, but cargoes (>40 KDa) such as RNA and larger proteins require the participation of soluble transport receptors.

The largest family of nuclear transport receptors are karyopherins, that include importins or exportins. These are a superfamily that facilitates the translocation of proteins, RNAs, and ribonuclear particles across the NPC in a Ran GTP hydrolase-dependent process. This family is further subdivided to the karyopherin-α (Importin α) and the karyopherin-β (Importin β) subfamilies. Other nuclear transport receptors include NTF2 and some NTF2-like proteins.

Three models have been suggested to explain the translocation mechanism:

- Affinity gradients along the central plug
- Brownian affinity gating
- Selective phase

=== Import of proteins ===
Nuclear proteins are synthesized in the cytoplasm and need to be imported through the NPCs into the nucleus. Import can be directed by various signals, of which nuclear localization signal (NLS) are best characterized. Several NLS sequences are known, generally containing a conserved sequence with basic residues such as PKKKRKV. Any material with an NLS will be taken up by importins to the nucleus.

Importation begins with Importin-α binding to the NLS sequence of cargo proteins, forming a complex. Importin-β then attaches to Importin-α, facilitating transport towards the NPC.

As the complex reaches the NPC, it diffuses through the pore without the need for additional energy. Upon entry into the nucleus, RanGTP binds to Importin-β and displaces it from the complex. Then the cellular apoptosis susceptibility protein (CAS), an exportin which in the nucleus is bound to RanGTP, displaces Importin-α from the cargo. The NLS-protein is thus free in the nucleoplasm. The Importinβ-RanGTP and Importinα-CAS-RanGTP complex diffuses back to the cytoplasm where GTPs are hydrolyzed to GDP leading to the release of Importin-β and Importin-α which become available for a new NLS-protein import round.

While translocation through the NPC is not energy-dependent, the overall import cycle needs the hydrolysis of two GTPs molecules, making it an active transport process. The import cycle is powered by the nucleo-cytoplasmic RanGTP gradient. This gradient arises from the exclusive nuclear localization of RanGEFs, proteins that exchange GDP to GTP on Ran molecules. Thus, there is an elevated RanGTP concentration in the nucleus compared to the cytoplasm.

=== Export of proteins ===
In addition to nuclear import, certain molecules and macromolecular complexes, such as ribosome subunits and messenger RNAs, require export from the nucleus to the cytoplasm. This export process mirrors the import mechanism in complexity and importance.

In a classical export scenario, proteins with a nuclear export sequence (NES) form a heterotrimeric complex with an exportin and RanGTP within the nucleus. Example of such an exportin is CRM1. This complex subsequently translocates to the cytoplasm, where GTP hydrolysis occurs, releasing the NES-containing protein. The resulting CRM1-RanGDP complex returns to the nucleus, where RanGEFs catalyze the exchange of GDP for GTP on Ran, replenishing the system's energy source. This entire process is energy-dependent and consumes one GTP molecule. Notably, the export activity mediated by CRM1 can be inhibited by compounds like leptomycin B.

=== Export of RNA ===
Different export pathways through the NPC for various RNA classes exist. RNA export is signal-mediated, with nuclear export signals (NES) present in RNA-binding proteins, except for tRNA which lacks an adapter. It is notable that all viral RNAs and cellular RNAs (tRNA, rRNA, U snRNA, microRNA) except mRNA are dependent on RanGTP. Conserved mRNA export factors are necessary for mRNA nuclear export. Export factors are Mex67/Tap (large subunit) and Mtr2/p15 (small subunit).

In highest eukaryotes, mRNA export is believed to be splicing-dependent. Splicing recruits the TREX protein complex to spliced messages, serving as an adapter for Transporter associated with antigen processing (TAP), a low-affinity RNA-binding protein. However, there are alternative mRNA export pathways that do not rely on splicing for specialized messages such as histones. Recent work also suggest an interplay between splicing-dependent export and one of these alternative mRNA export pathways for secretory and mitochondrial transcripts.

== Assembly of the NPC ==
Cell nucleus containing nuclear pores.

Since the NPC regulates genome access, its presence in significant quantities during cell cycle stages characterized by high transcription rates is crucial. For example, cycling mammalian and yeast cells double the amount of NPC in the nucleus between the G1 and G2 phase. Similarly, oocytes accumulate abundant NPCs in anticipation of the rapid mitotic activity during early development. Moreover, interphase cells must maintain NPC generation to sustain consistent NPC levels, as some may incur damage. Furthermore, certain cells can even increase the NPC numbers due to increased transcriptional demand.

=== Theories of assembly ===
There are several theories as to how NPCs are assembled. As the immunodepletion of certain protein complexes, such as the Nup 107–160 complex, leads to the formation of poreless nuclei, it seems likely that the Nup complexes are involved in fusing the outer membrane of the nuclear envelope with the inner and not that the fusing of the membrane begins the formation of the pore. There are several ways that this could lead to the formation of the full NPC.

- One possibility is that as a protein complex it binds to the chromatin. It is then inserted into the double membrane close to the chromatin. This, in turn, leads to the fusing of that membrane. Around this protein complex others eventually bind forming the NPC. This method is possible during every phase of mitosis as the double membrane is present around the chromatin before the membrane fusion proteins complex can insert. Post mitotic cells could form a membrane first with pores being inserted into after formation.
- Another model for the formation of the NPC is the production of a prepore as a start as opposed to a single protein complex. This prepore would form when several Nup complexes come together and bind to the chromatin. This would have the double membrane form around it in during mitotic reassembly. Possible prepore structures have been observed on chromatin before nuclear envelope (NE) formation using electron microscopy. During the interphase of the cell cycle the formation of the prepore would happen within the nucleus, each component being transported in through existing NPCs. These Nups would bind to an importin, once formed, preventing the assembly of a prepore in the cytoplasm. Once transported into the nucleus Ran GTP would bind to the importin and cause it to release the cargo. This Nup would be free to form a prepore. The binding of importins has at least been shown to bring Nup 107 and the Nup 153 nucleoporins into the nucleus. NPC assembly is a very rapid process yet defined intermediate states occur which leads to the idea that this assembly occurs in a stepwise fashion.

=== Disassembly ===
During mitosis the NPC appears to disassemble in stages, except in lower eukaryotes like yeast, where NPC disassembly does not happen during mitosis. Peripheral nucleoporins, such as the Nup153 Nup98 and Nup214, disassociate from the NPC. The rest, which can be considered as scaffold proteins remain stable, as cylindrical ring complexes within the nuclear envelope (NE). This disassembly of the NPC peripheral groups is largely thought to be phosphate driven, as several of these nucleoporins are phosphorylated during the stages of mitosis. However, the enzyme involved in the phosphorylation is unknown in vivo. In metazoans (which undergo open mitosis) the NE degrades quickly after the loss of the peripheral Nups. The reason for this may be due to the change in the NPC's architecture. This change may make the NPC more permeable to enzymes involved in the degradation of the NE such as cytoplasmic tubulin, as well as allowing the entry of key mitotic regulator proteins. In organisms that undergo a semi-open mitosis such as the filamentous fungus Aspergillus nidulans, 14 out of the 30 nucleoporins disassemble from the core scaffold structure, driven by the activation of the NIMA and Cdk1 kinases that phosphorylate nucleoporins and open nuclear pores thereby widening the nuclear pore and allowing the entry of mitotic regulators.

=== Preservation of integrity ===
In fungi undergoing closed mitosis, where the nucleus remains intact, changes in the permeability barrier of the nuclear envelope are attributed to alterations within the NPC. These changes facilitate the entry of mitotic regulators into the nucleus. Studies in Aspergillys nidulans suggest that the NPC composition appears to be effected by the mitotic kinase NIMA. NIMA potentially phosphorylates nucleoporins Nup98 and Gle2/Rae1, leading to NPC remodeling. This remodeling allows the nuclear entry of the protein complex cdc2/cyclinB and various other proteins, including soluble tubulin. The NPC scaffold remains intact throughout the whole closed mitosis. This seems to preserve the integrity of the nuclear envelope.
