= Ran (protein) =

GTPase functioning in nuclear transport

RAN
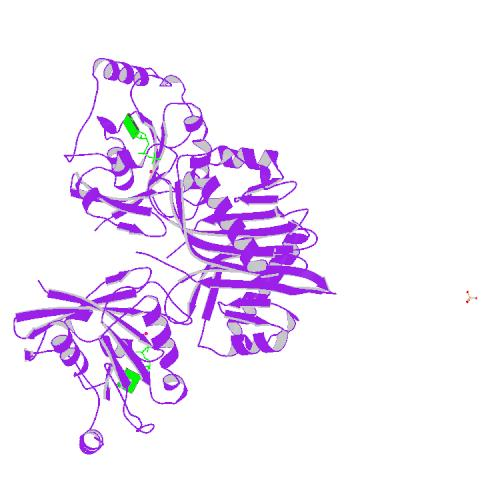

Identifiers
- Aliases: RAN, ARA24, Gsp1, TC4, Ran, member RAS oncogene family
- External IDs: OMIM: 601179; MGI: 1333112; GeneCards: RAN
Available structures
PDB	Ortholog search: PDBe RCSB
PDB	List of PDB id codes 1I2M, 1IBR, 1K5D, 1K5G, 1QBK, 1RRP, 2MMC, 2MMG, 3CH5, 3EA5, 3GJ0, 3GJ3, 3GJ4, 3GJ5, 3GJ6, 3GJ7, 3GJ8, 3GJX, 3NBY, 3NBZ, 3NC0, 3NC1, 3ZJY, 4C0Q, 4GMX, 4GPT, 4HAT, 4HAU, 4HAV, 4HAW, 4HAX, 4HAY, 4HAZ, 4HB0, 4HB2, 4HB3, 4HB4, 4OL0, 4WVF, 5CIQ, 5CIT, 5CIW, 5CJ2, 5CLL, 5CLQ, 5DH9, 5DHA, 5DHF, 5DI9, 5DIF, 3A6P, 1A2K, 5DIS, 5BXQ, 5DLQ, 5FYQ, 2N1B, 5JLJ

Gene location (Human)
Chr.	Chromosome 12 (human)
Band	12q24.33	Start	130,872,037 bp
Band	12q24.33	End	130,877,678 bp

Gene location (Mouse)
Chr.	Chromosome 5 (mouse)
Band	5|5 G1.3	Start	129,097,133 bp
Band	5|5 G1.3	End	129,101,387 bp
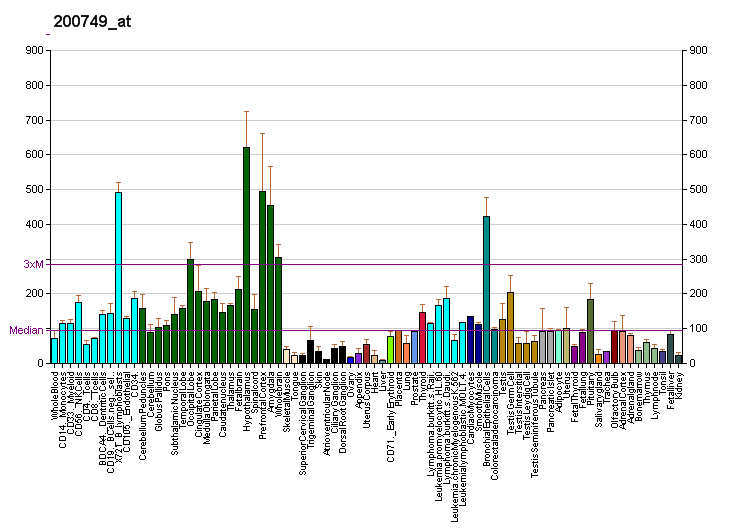

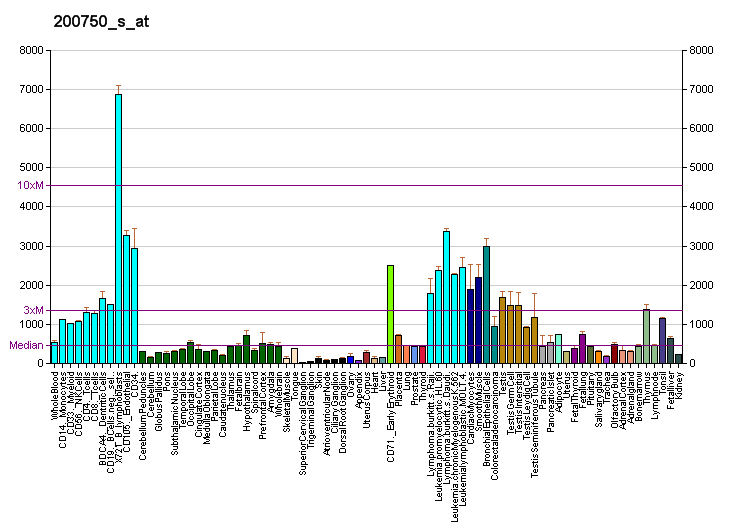
RNA expression pattern
Bgee	Human / Mouse (ortholog); Top expressed in: gonad; ventricular zone; ganglionic eminence; right testis; left testis; stromal cell of endometrium; right adrenal gland; mucosa of transverse colon; left adrenal gland; left adrenal cortex / Top expressed in: embryo; embryo; ventricular zone; otic placode; otic vesicle; yolk sac; lens; habenula; neural tube; arcuate nucleus; More reference expression data
BioGPS	More reference expression data
Gene ontology
Molecular function	nucleotide binding; transcription coactivator activity; pre-miRNA binding; chromatin binding; protein binding; androgen receptor binding; GTPase activity; GTP binding; RNA binding; cadherin binding; magnesium ion binding; structural constituent of nuclear pore; GDP binding; protein heterodimerization activity; nuclear export signal receptor activity; metal ion binding; protein domain specific binding; protein-containing complex binding; dynein intermediate chain binding; importin-alpha family protein binding
Cellular component	recycling endosome; cytosol; Flemming body; melanosome; nucleoplasm; midbody; RNA nuclear export complex; nucleolus; centriole; chromatin; extracellular exosome; membrane; cytoplasm; nucleus; extracellular matrix; nuclear pore; host cell; nuclear envelope; protein-containing complex; male germ cell nucleus; manchette; sperm flagellum
Biological process	ribosomal small subunit export from nucleus; intracellular transport of virus; androgen receptor signaling pathway; protein localization to nucleolus; mitotic spindle organization; DNA metabolic process; pre-miRNA export from nucleus; cell division; positive regulation of transcription, DNA-templated; nucleocytoplasmic transport; protein export from nucleus; protein transport; ribosomal large subunit export from nucleus; cell cycle; positive regulation of protein binding; viral process; tRNA export from nucleus; mitotic cell cycle; protein import into nucleus; miRNA metabolic process; regulation of cholesterol biosynthetic process; regulation of gene silencing by miRNA; transport; mitotic sister chromatid segregation; GTP metabolic process; snRNA import into nucleus; positive regulation of protein import into nucleus; spermatid development; response to organic cyclic compound; hippocampus development; actin cytoskeleton organization; regulation of protein binding; cellular response to mineralocorticoid stimulus
Sources:Amigo / QuickGO
Orthologs
Databases	NCBI: entry; OMA: entry
Species	Human	Mouse
Entrez	5901	19384
Ensembl	ENSG00000132341	ENSMUSG00000029430
UniProt	P62826	P62827
RefSeq (mRNA)	NM_006325; NM_001300796; NM_001300797	NM_009391
RefSeq (protein)	NP_001287725; NP_001287726; NP_006316	NP_033417
Location (UCSC)	Chr 12: 130.87 – 130.88 Mb	Chr 5: 129.1 – 129.1 Mb
PubMed search
- Wikidata
View/Edit Human	View/Edit Mouse

Ran (RAs-related Nuclear protein) also known as GTP-binding nuclear protein Ran is a protein that in humans is encoded by the RAN gene. Ran is a small 25 kDa protein that is involved in transport into and out of the cell nucleus during interphase and also involved in mitosis. It is a member of the Ras superfamily.

Ran is a small G protein that is essential for the translocation of RNA and proteins through the nuclear pore complex. The Ran protein has also been implicated in the control of DNA synthesis and cell cycle progression, as mutations in Ran have been found to disrupt DNA synthesis.

== Function ==
=== Ran cycle ===
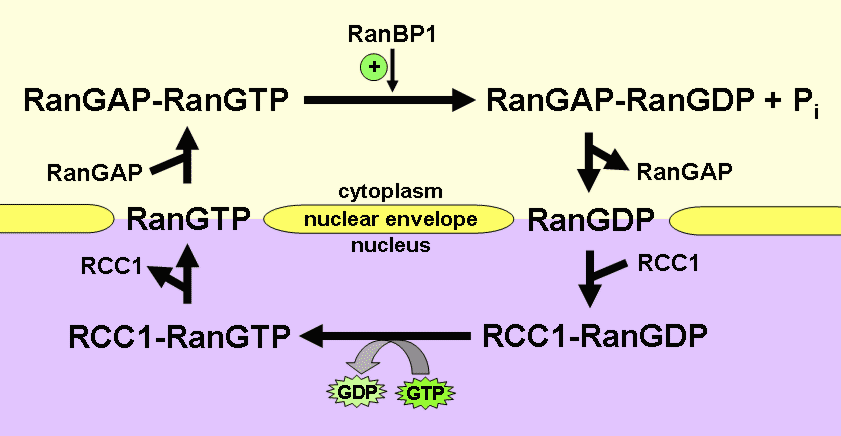
Schematic representation of the Ran cycle

Ran exists in the cell in two nucleotide-bound forms: GDP-bound and GTP-bound. RanGDP is converted into RanGTP through the action of RCC1, the nucleotide exchange factor for Ran. RCC1 is also known as RanGEF (Ran Guanine nucleotide Exchange Factor). Ran's intrinsic GTPase-activity is activated through interaction with Ran GTPase activating protein (RanGAP), facilitated by complex formation with Ran-binding protein (RanBP). GTPase-activation leads to the conversion of RanGTP to RanGDP, thus closing the Ran cycle.

Ran can diffuse freely within the cell, but because RCC1 and RanGAP are located in different places in the cell, the concentration of RanGTP and RanGDP differs locally as well, creating concentration gradients that act as signals for other cellular processes. RCC1 is bound to chromatin and therefore located inside the nucleus. RanGAP is cytoplasmic in yeast and bound to the nuclear envelope in plants and animals. In mammalian cells, it is SUMO modified and attached to the cytoplasmic side of the nuclear pore complex via interaction with the nucleoporin RANBP2 (Nup358). This difference in location of the accessory proteins in the Ran cycle leads to a high RanGTP to RanGDP ratio inside the nucleus and an inversely low RanGTP to RanGDP ratio outside the nucleus. In addition to a gradient of the nucleotide bound state of Ran, there is a gradient of the protein itself, with a higher concentration of Ran in the nucleus than in the cytoplasm. Cytoplasmic RanGDP is imported into the nucleus by the small protein NUTF2 (Nuclear Transport Factor 2), where RCC1 can then catalyze exchange of GDP for GTP on Ran.

=== Role in nuclear transport during interphase ===
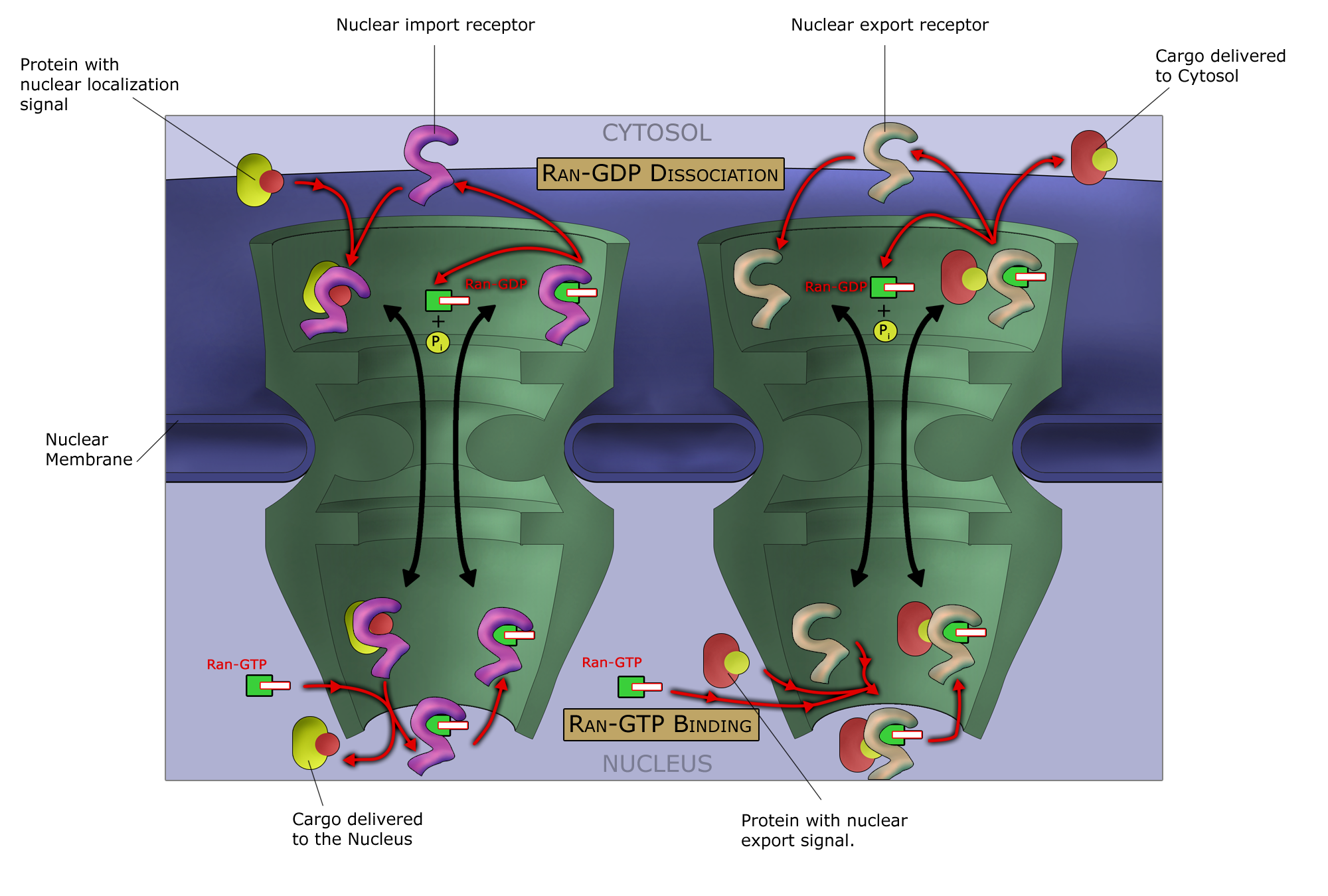
Ran cycle involvement in nucleocytoplasmic transport at the nuclear pore

Ran is involved in the transport of proteins across the nuclear envelope by interacting with karyopherins and changing their ability to bind or release cargo molecules. Cargo proteins containing a nuclear localization signal (NLS) are bound by importins and transported into the nucleus. Inside the nucleus, RanGTP binds to importin and releases the import cargo. Cargo that needs to get out of the nucleus into the cytoplasm binds to exportin in a ternary complex with RanGTP. Upon hydrolysis of RanGTP to RanGDP outside the nucleus, the complex dissociates and export cargo is released.

=== Role in mitosis ===
During mitosis, the Ran cycle is involved in mitotic spindle assembly and nuclear envelope reassembly after the chromosomes have been separated. During prophase, the steep gradient in RanGTP-RanGDP ratio at the nuclear pores breaks down as the nuclear envelope becomes leaky and disassembles. RanGTP concentration stays high around the chromosomes as RCC1, a nucleotide exchange factor, stays attached to chromatin. RanBP2 (Nup358) and RanGAP move to the kinetochores where they facilitate the attachment of spindle fibers to chromosomes. Moreover, RanGTP promotes spindle assembly by mechanisms similar to mechanisms of nuclear transport: the activity of spindle assembly factors such as NuMA and TPX2 is inhibited by the binding to importins. By releasing importins, RanGTP activates these factors and therefore promotes the assembly of the mitotic spindle. In telophase, RanGTP hydrolysis and nucleotide exchange are required for vesicle fusion at the reforming nuclear envelopes of the daughter nuclei.

=== Ran and the androgen receptor ===
RAN is an androgen receptor (AR) coactivator (ARA24) that binds differentially with different lengths of polyglutamine within the androgen receptor. Polyglutamine repeat expansion in the AR is linked to spinal and bulbar muscular atrophy (Kennedy's disease). RAN coactivation of the AR diminishes with polyglutamine expansion within the AR, and this weak coactivation may lead to partial androgen insensitivity during the development of spinal and bulbar muscular atrophy.

== Interactions ==
Ran has been shown to interact with:

- KPNB1,
- NEK9,
- NUTF2,
- RANBP1,
- RANGAP1,
- RCC1,
- TNPO1,
- TNPO2,
- XPO1, and
- XPO5.

== Regulation ==
The expression of Ran is repressed by the microRNA miR-10a.

== See also ==
- GTPase
- importin
- mitosis
- nuclear envelope
- nuclear transport
- RGPD5
- small GTPase
