= Eltanexor =

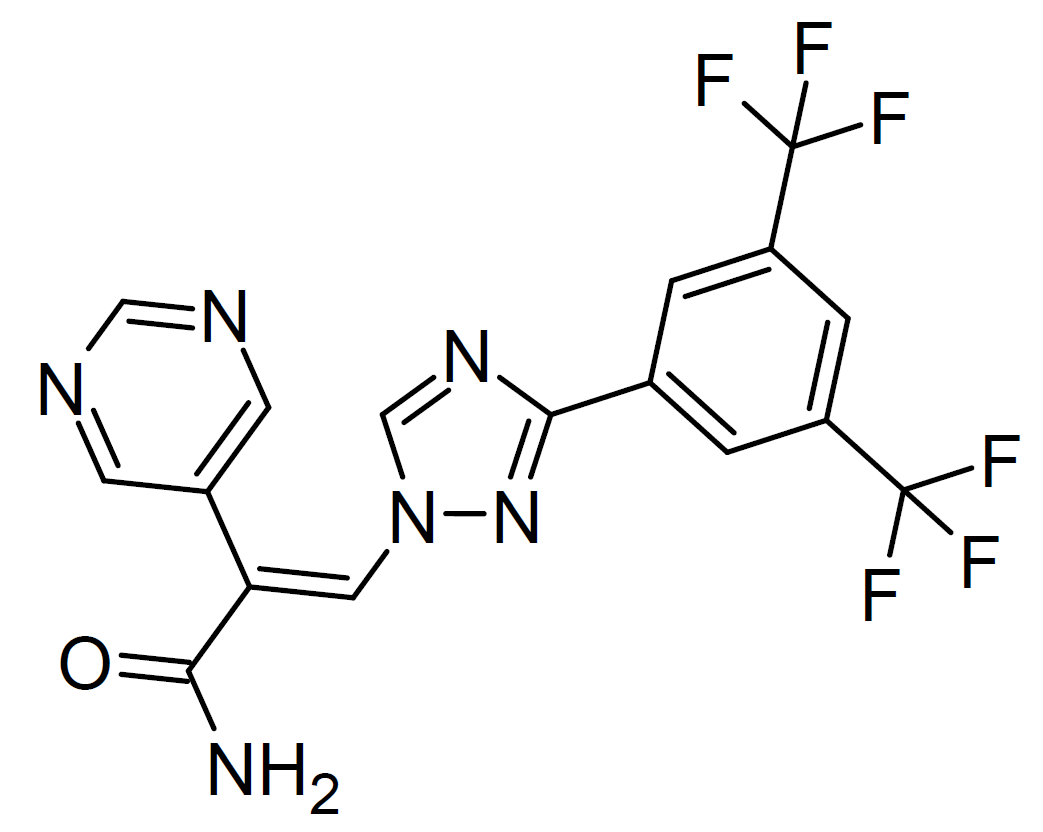

Identifiers
- IUPAC name: (E)-3-[3-[3,5-bis(trifluoromethyl)phenyl]-1,2,4-triazol-1-yl]-2-pyrimidin-5-ylprop-2-enamide
- CAS Number: 1642300-52-4
- PubChem CID: 86345880
- IUPHAR/BPS: 10037
- DrugBank: DB16153
- ChemSpider: 59718641
- UNII: Q59IQJ9NTK
- KEGG: D11499
- ChEBI: CHEBI:229762
- ChEMBL: ChEMBL4297623

Chemical and physical data
- Formula: C_{17}H_{10}F_{6}N_{6}O
- Molar mass: 428.298 g·mol^{−1}
- 3D model (JSmol): Interactive image
- SMILES: C1=C(C=C(C=C1C(F)(F)F)C(F)(F)F)C2=NN(C=N2)/C=C(\C3=CN=CN=C3)/C(=O)N
- InChI: InChI=1S/C17H10F6N6O/c18-16(19,20)11-1-9(2-12(3-11)17(21,22)23)15-27-8-29(28-15)6-13(14(24)30)10-4-25-7-26-5-10/h1-8H,(H2,24,30)/b13-6+; Key:JFBAVWVBLRIWHM-AWNIVKPZSA-N

Eltanexor (KPT-8602) is an experimental drug which is a selective inhibitor of nuclear export (SINE), acting as a selective inhibitor of the XPO1 nuclear export protein. Levels of this protein are frequently elevated in numerous forms of cancer, such as prostate cancer and multiple myeloma, and eltanexor has shown promising results in several clinical trials, mainly as a combination treatment with other drugs rather than a sole agent. It has also shown potential for the treatment of osteoporosis.

== See also ==
- Selinexor
