= Toma Ciorbă =

Moldavian physician (1864–1936)

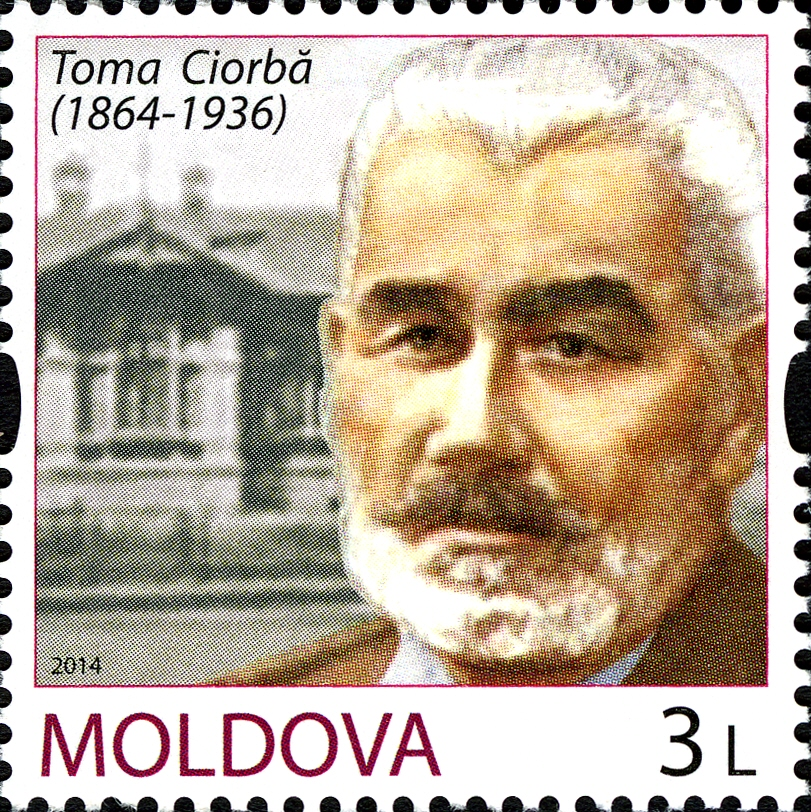
2014 Moldovan stamp featuring Ciorbă and his hospital

Toma Ciorbă (15 January 1864 – 30 December 1936) was a Moldovan physician and hospital director.

== Biography ==
Born in Chișinău, then the capital of the Russian Empire's Bessarabia Governorate, after 1918 a part of Greater Romania and now the capital of Moldova, he was the first of six children and his father was a soldier. In 1875, he entered Bessarabia's leading secondary school, and in 1885, he began studying at Kiev University's medicine faculty. In 1893, after graduation, he returned to his native city to work as a physician in the health service.

In 1896, he planned and opened an infectious disease hospital, of which he became director. It was the first specialized medical facility in the province, and Ciorbă, in addition to being administrator, worked as a bacteriologist and a teacher to young nurses and midwives. He encountered resistance both from the authorities and from the increasing number of private doctors, and found it difficult to purchase equipment and medicine. He lived modestly and did not charge poor patients, indeed often paying for their medicines or sending them wood for their stoves. He was invited to work in Saint Petersburg, but declined.

He promoted an anti-smallpox vaccine, creating a laboratory for its production, and began a program for the compulsory vaccination of children against the disease. In addition, he introduced vaccine therapy in the treatment of diphtheria. In the Russo-Japanese War, he served as a field doctor in the Imperial Russian Army. Afterwards, he initiated a provincial society for Red Cross nurses, and managed the building of a Red Cross clinic. He retired as hospital director in 1932. Today, both the Chișinău Infectious Disease Hospital and a nearby street bear his name. A bust of the figure has been erected on the Alley of Distinguished Doctors and Scientists, next to the Chisinau University of Medicine and Pharmacy. It was created by Moldovan sculptor Veaceslav Jiglițchi.
