= PLXNA2 =

Protein-coding gene in humans

Identifiers
- Aliases: PLXNA2, OCT, PLXN2, plexin A2
- External IDs: OMIM: 601054; MGI: 107684; GeneCards: PLXNA2
Available structures
PDB	Ortholog search: PDBe RCSB
PDB	List of PDB id codes 3Q3J

Gene location (Human)
Chr.	Chromosome 1 (human)
Band	1q32.2	Start	208,022,242 bp
Band	1q32.2	End	208,244,384 bp

Gene location (Mouse)
Chr.	Chromosome 1 (mouse)
Band	1|1 H6	Start	194,300,526 bp
Band	1|1 H6	End	194,499,177 bp
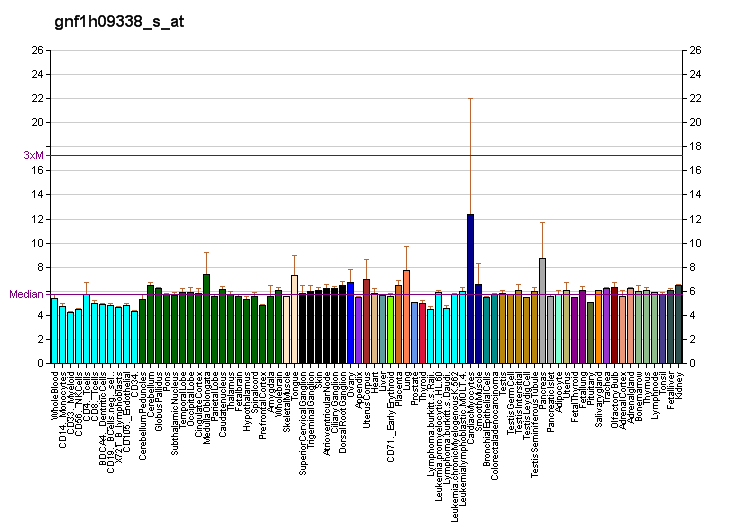

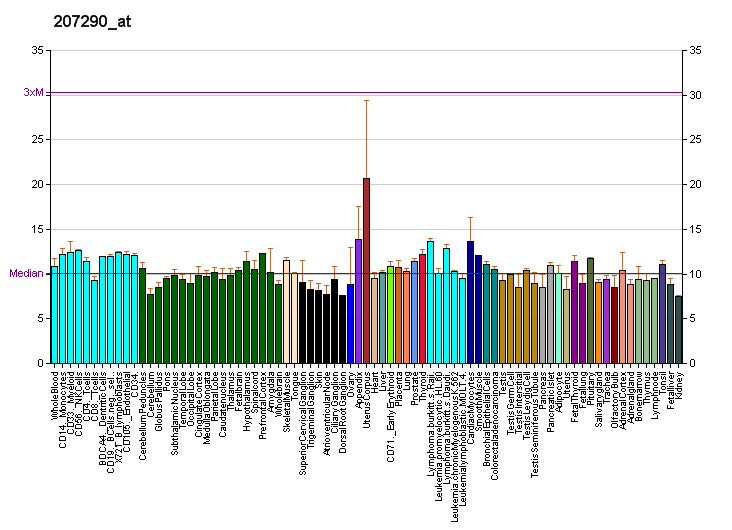

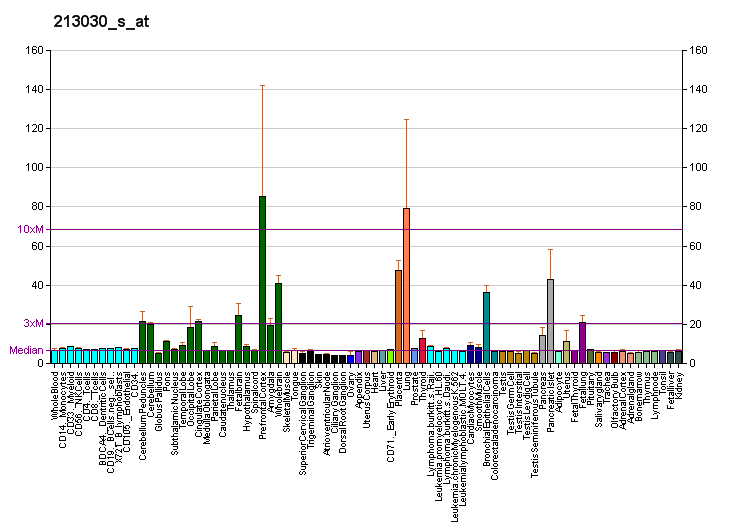
RNA expression pattern
Bgee	Human / Mouse (ortholog); Top expressed in: ganglionic eminence; body of pancreas; right lung; upper lobe of left lung; left ovary; right hemisphere of cerebellum; right ovary; postcentral gyrus; left coronary artery; right coronary artery / Top expressed in: ganglionic eminence; Rostral migratory stream; medial ganglionic eminence; olfactory tubercle; hair follicle; lateral septal nucleus; nucleus accumbens; internal carotid artery; ventromedial nucleus; external carotid artery; More reference expression data
BioGPS	More reference expression data
Gene ontology
Molecular function	protein binding; semaphorin receptor activity; identical protein binding
Cellular component	integral component of membrane; plasma membrane; semaphorin receptor complex; membrane; integral component of plasma membrane
Biological process	somitogenesis; cell surface receptor signaling pathway; regulation of axon extension involved in axon guidance; cerebellar granule cell precursor tangential migration; branchiomotor neuron axon guidance; limb bud formation; neural tube development; semaphorin-plexin signaling pathway; signal transduction; pharyngeal system development; centrosome localization; regulation of cell migration; negative regulation of cell adhesion; regulation of cell shape; regulation of GTPase activity; positive regulation of axonogenesis; semaphorin-plexin signaling pathway involved in axon guidance
Sources:Amigo / QuickGO
Orthologs
Databases	NCBI: entry; OMA: entry
Species	Human	Mouse
Entrez	5362	18845
Ensembl	ENSG00000076356	ENSMUSG00000026640
UniProt	O75051	P70207
RefSeq (mRNA)	NM_025179	NM_008882
RefSeq (protein)	NP_079455	NP_032908
Location (UCSC)	Chr 1: 208.02 – 208.24 Mb	Chr 1: 194.3 – 194.5 Mb
PubMed search
- Wikidata
View/Edit Human	View/Edit Mouse

Plexin-A2 is a protein that in humans is coded by the PLXNA2 gene.

This gene encodes a member of the plexin-A family of semaphorin co-receptors. Semaphorins are a large family of secreted or membrane-bound proteins that mediate repulsive effects on axon pathfinding during nervous system development. A subset of semaphorins are recognized by plexin-A/neuropilin transmembrane receptor complexes, triggering a cellular signal transduction cascade that leads to axon repulsion. This plexin-A family member is thought to transduce signals from semaphorin-3A and -3C.

In some studies, the PLXNA2 gene is associated with schizophrenia. and anxiety. PLXNA2 is a candidate gene for intellectual disability and possibly facial dysmorphism and congenital heart disease
