= Co-receptor =

Type of cell surface receptor

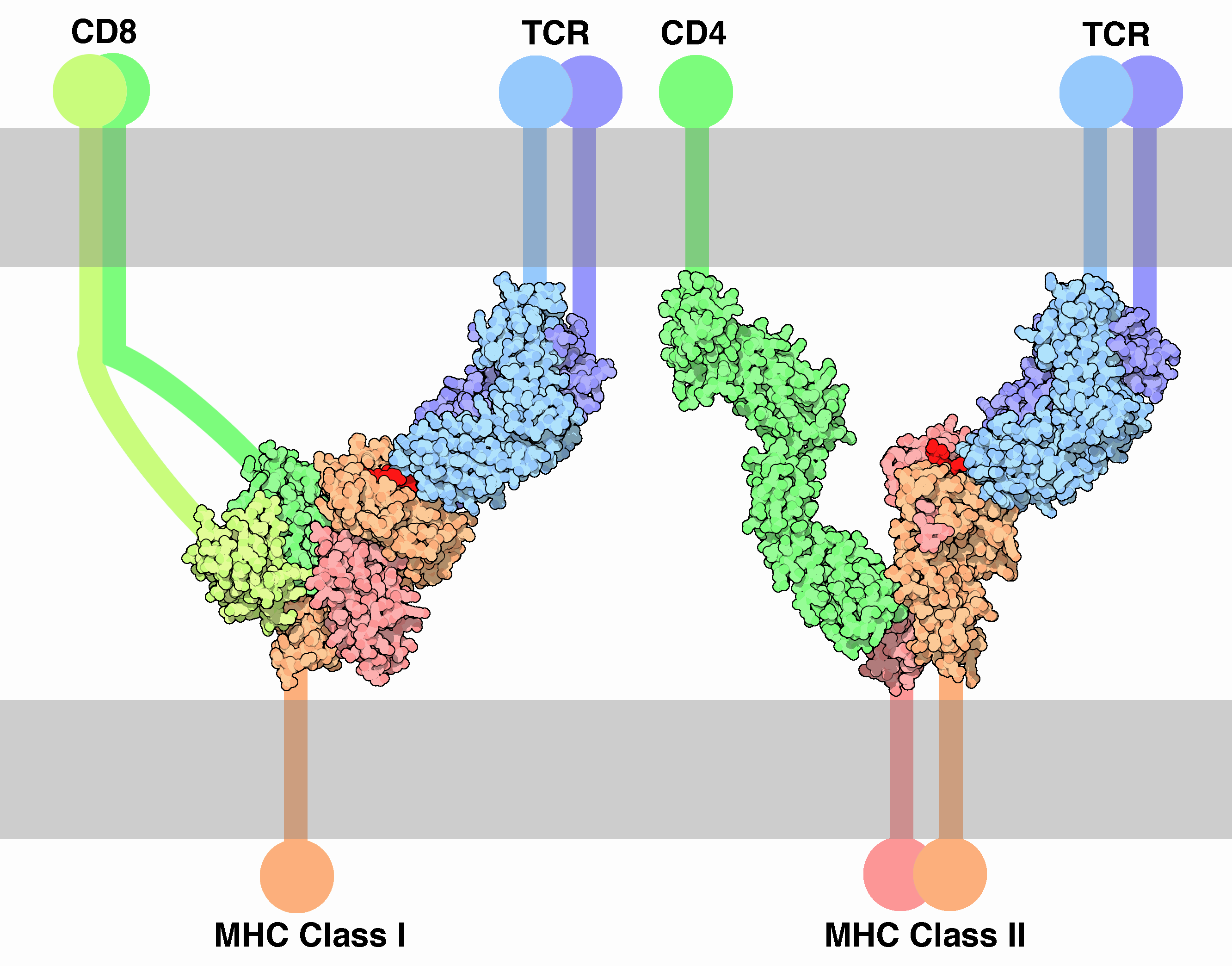
T Cell Receptor complexed with MHC I and II.

A co-receptor is a cell surface receptor that binds a signalling molecule in addition to a primary receptor in order to facilitate ligand recognition and initiate biological processes, such as entry of a pathogen into a host cell.

== Properties ==
The term co-receptor is prominent in literature regarding signal transduction, the process by which external stimuli regulate internal cellular functioning. The key to optimal cellular functioning is maintained by possessing specific machinery that can carry out tasks efficiently and effectively. Specifically, the process through which intermolecular reactions forward and amplify extracellular signals across the cell surface has developed to occur by two mechanisms. First, cell surface receptors can directly transduce signals by possessing both serine and threonine or simply serine in the cytoplasmic domain. They can also transmit signals through adaptor molecules through their cytoplasmic domain which bind to signalling motifs. Secondly, certain surface receptors lacking a cytoplasmic domain can transduce signals through ligand binding. Once the surface receptor binds the ligand it forms a complex with a corresponding surface receptor to regulate signalling. These categories of cell surface receptors are prominently referred to as co-receptors. Co-receptors are also referred to as accessory receptors, especially in the fields of biomedical research and immunology.

Co-receptors are proteins that maintain a three-dimensional structure. The large extracellular domains make up approximately 76–100% of the receptor. The motifs that make up the large extracellular domains participate in ligand binding and complex formation. The motifs can include glycosaminoglycans, EGF repeats, cysteine residues or ZP-1 domains. The variety of motifs leads to co-receptors being able to interact with two to nine different ligands, which themselves can also interact with a number of different co-receptors. Most co-receptors lack a cytoplasmic domain and tend to be GPI-anchored, though a few receptors have been identified which contain short cytoplasmic domains that lack intrinsic kinase activity.

== Localization and function ==
Depending on the type of ligand a co-receptor binds, its location and function can vary. Various ligands include interleukins, neurotrophic factors, fibroblast growth factors, transforming growth factors, vascular endothelial growth factors and epidermal growth factors. Co-receptors prominent in embryonic tissue have an essential role in morphogen gradient formation or tissue differentiation. Co-receptors localized in endothelial cells function to enhance cell proliferation and cell migration. With such variety in regards to location, co-receptors can participate in many different cellular activities. Co-receptors have been identified as participants in cell signalling cascades, embryonic development, cell adhesion regulation, gradient formation, tissue proliferation and migration.

== Some classical examples ==
=== CD family ===
The CD family of co-receptors are a well-studied group of extracellular receptors found in immunological cells. The CD receptor family typically act as co-receptors, illustrated by the classic example of CD4 acting as a co-receptor to the T cell receptor (TCR) to bind major histocompatibility complex II (MHC-II). This binding is particularly well-studied in T-cells where it serves to activate T-cells that are in their resting (or dormant) phase and to cause active cycling T-cells to undergo programmed cell death. Boehme et al. demonstrated this interesting dual outcome by blocking the binding of CD4 to MHC-II which prevented the programmed cell death reaction that active T-cells typically display.

The CD4 receptor is composed of four concatemerized Ig-like domains and is anchored to the cell membrane by a single transmembrane domain. CD family receptors are typically monomers or dimers, though they are all primarily extracellular proteins. The CD4 receptor in particular interacts with murine MHC-II following the "ball-on-stick" model, where the Phe-43 ball fits into the conserved hydrophobic α2 and β2 domain residues. During binding with MHC-II, CD4 maintains independent structure and does not form any bonds with the TCR receptor.

The members of the CD family of co-receptors have a wide range of function. As well as being involved in forming a complex with MHC-II with TCR to control T-cell fate, the CD4 receptor is the primary receptor that HIV envelope glycoprotein GP120 binds to. In comparison, CD28 acts as a ‘co-coreceptor’ (costimulatory receptor) for the MHC-II binding with TCR and CD4. CD28 increases the IL-2 secretion from the T-cells if it is involved in the initial activation; however, CD28 blockage has no effect on programmed cell death after the T-cell has been activated.

=== CCR family of receptors ===
The CCR family of receptors are a group of g-protein coupled receptors (GPCRs) that normally operate as chemokine receptors. They are primarily found on immunological cells, especially T-cells. CCR receptors are also expressed on neuronal cells, such as dendrites and microglia.

An important member of the CCR family is CCR5 (and its near-homologue CXCR4), which acts as the primary co-receptor for HIV viral infection. The HIV envelope glycoprotein GP120 binds to CD4 as its primary receptor, CCR5 then forms a complex with CD4 and HIV, allowing viral entry into the cell. CCR5 is not the only member of the CCR family that allows for HIV infection. Due to the commonality of structures found throughout the family, CCR2b, CCR3, and CCR8 can be utilized by some HIV strains as co-receptors to facilitate infection. CXCR4 is very similar to CCR5 in structure. While only some HIV strains can utilize CCR2b, CCR3 and CCR8, all HIV strains can infect through CCR5 and CXCR4.

CCR5 is known to have an affinity for macrophage inflammatory protein (MIP) and is thought to play a role in inflammatory immunological responses. The primary role of this receptor is less understood than its role in HIV infection, as inflammation responses remain a poorly understood facet of the immune system. CCR5's affinity for MIP makes it of great interest for practical applications such as tissue engineering, where attempts are being made to control host inflammatory and immunological responses at a cellular signalling level. The affinity for MIP has been utilized in-vitro to prevent HIV infection through ligand competition; however, these entry-inhibitors have failed in-vivo due to the highly adaptive nature of HIV and toxicity concerns.

== Clinical significance ==
Because of their importance in cell signaling and regulation, co-receptors have been implicated in a number of diseases and disorders. Co-receptor knockout mice are often unable to develop and such knockouts generally result in embryonic or perinatal lethality. In immunology in particular, the term "co-receptor" often describes a secondary receptor used by a pathogen to gain access to the cell, or a receptor that works alongside T cell receptors such as CD4, CD8, or CD28 to bind antigens or regulate T cell activity in some way.

=== Inherited co-receptor autosomal disorders ===
Many co-receptor-related disorders occur due to mutations in the receptor's coding gene. LRP5 (low-density lipoprotein receptor-related protein 5) acts as a co-receptor for the Wnt-family of glycoproteins which regulate bone mass. Malfunctions in this co-receptor lead to lower bone density and strength which contribute to osteoporosis.

Loss of function mutations in LRP5 have been implicated in Osteoporosis-pseudoglioma syndrome, Familial exudative vitreoretinopathy, and a specific missense mutation in the first β-propeller region of LRP5 can lead to abnormally high bone density or osteopetrosis. Mutations in LRP1 have also been found in cases of Familial Alzheimer's disease

Loss of function mutations in the Cryptic co-receptor can lead to random organ positioning due to developmental left-right orientation defects.

Gigantism is believed to be caused, in some cases, by a loss of function of the Glypican 3 co-receptor.

=== Cancer ===
Carcinoembryonic antigen cell adhesion molecule-1 (Caecam1) is an immunoglobulin-like co-receptor that aids in cell adhesion in epithelial, endothelial and hematopoietic cells, and plays a vital role during vascularization and angiogenesis by binding vascular endothelial growth factor (VEGF).

Angiogenesis is important in embryonic development but it is also a fundamental process of tumor growth. Deletion of the gene in Caecam1-/- mice results in a reduction of the abnormal vascularization seen in cancer and lowered nitric oxide production, suggesting a therapeutic possibility through targeting of this gene. The neuropilin co-receptor family mediates binding of VEGF in conjunction with the VEGFR1/VEGFR2 and Plexin signaling receptors, and therefore also plays a role in tumor vascular development.

CD109 acts as a negative regulator of the tumor growth factor β (TGF-β) receptor. Upon binding TGF-β, the receptor is internalized via endocytosis through CD109's action which lowers signal transmission into the cell. In this case, the co-receptor is functioning in a critical regulatory manner to reduce signals that instruct the cell to grow and migrate – the hallmarks of cancer. In conjunction, the LRP co-receptor family also mediates binding of TGF-β with a variety of membrane receptors.

Interleukins 1, 2, and 5 all rely on interleukin co-receptors to bind to the primary interleukin receptors.

Syndecans 1 and 4 have been implicated in a variety of cancer types including cervical, breast, lung, and colon cancer, and abnormal expression levels have been associated with poorer prognosis.

=== HIV ===
In order to infect a cell, the envelope glycoprotein GP120 of the HIV virus interacts with CD4 (acting as the primary receptor) and a co-receptor: either CCR5 or CXCR4. This binding results in membrane fusion and the subsequent intracellular signaling that facilitates viral invasion. In approximately half of all HIV cases, the viruses using the CCR5 co-receptor seem to favor immediate infection and transmission while those using the CXCR4 receptor do not present until later in the immunologically suppressed stage of the disease. The virus will often switch from using CCR5 to CXCR4 during the course of the infection, which serves as an indicator for the progression of the disease. Recent evidence suggests that some forms of HIV also use the large integrin a4b7 receptor to facilitate increased binding efficiency in mucosal tissues.

=== Hepatitis C ===
The Hepatitis C virus requires the CD81 co-receptor for infection. Studies suggest that the tight junction protein Claudin-1 (CLDN1) may also play a part in HCV entry. Claudin family abnormalities are also common in hepatocellular carcinoma, which can result from HPV infection.

=== Blockade as a treatment for autoimmunity ===
It is possible to perform a CD4 co-receptor blockade, using antibodies, in order to lower T cell activation and counteract autoimmune disorders. This blockade appears to elicit a "dominant" effect, that is to say, once blocked, the T cells do not regain their ability to become active. This effect then spreads to native T cells which then switch to a CD4+CD25+GITR+FoxP3+ T regulatory phenotype.

== Current areas of research ==
Currently, the two most prominent areas of co-receptor research are investigations regarding HIV and cancer. HIV research is highly focused on the adaption of HIV strains to a variety of host co-receptors. Cancer research is mostly focused on enhancing the immune response to tumor cells, while some research also involves investigating the receptors expressed by the cancerous cells themselves.

=== HIV ===
Most HIV-based co-receptor research focuses on the CCR5 co-receptor. The majority of HIV strains use the CCR5 receptor. HIV-2 strains can also use the CXCR4 receptor though the CCR5 receptor is the more predominantly targeted of the two. Both the CCR5 and the CXCR4 co-receptors are seven-trans-membrane (7TM) G protein-coupled receptors. Different strains of HIV work on different co-receptors, although the virus can switch to utilizing other co-receptors. For example, R5X4 receptors can become the dominant HIV co-receptor target in main strains. HIV-1 and HIV-2 can both use the CCR8 co-receptor. The crossover of co-receptor targets for different strains and the ability for the strains to switch from their dominant co-receptor can impede clinical treatment of HIV. Treatments such as WR321 mAb can inhibit some strains of CCR5 HIV-1, preventing cell infection. The mAb causes the release of HIV-1-inhibitory b-chemokines, preventing other cells from becoming infected.

=== Cancer ===
Cancer-based research into co-receptors includes the investigation of growth factor activated co-receptors, such as Transforming Growth Factor (TGF-β) co-receptors. Expression of the co-receptor endoglin, which is expressed on the surface of tumor cells, is correlated with cell plasticity and the development of tumors. Another co-receptor of TGF-β is CD8. Although the exact mechanism is still unknown, CD8 co-receptors have been shown to enhance T-cell activation and TGF-β-mediated immune suppression. TGF-β has been shown to influence the plasticity of cells through integrin and focal adhesion kinase. The co-receptors of tumor cells and their interaction with T-cells provide important considerations for tumor immunotherapy. Recent research into co-receptors for p75, such as the sortilin co-receptor, has implicated sortilin in connection to neurotrophins, a type of nerve growth factor. The p75 receptor and co-receptors have been found to influence the aggressiveness of tumors, specifically via the ability of neurotrophins to rescue cells from certain forms of cell death. Sortilin, the p75 co-receptor, has been found in natural killer cells, but with only low levels of neurotrophin receptor. The sortilin co-receptor is believed to work with a neurotrophin homologue that can also cause neurotrophin to alter the immune response.

== See also ==
- Signal transduction
