= NMD3 =

Protein-coding gene in the species Homo sapiens

Identifiers
- Aliases: NMD3, CGI-07, NMD3 ribosome export adaptor
- External IDs: OMIM: 611021; MGI: 2140103; HomoloGene: 6127; GeneCards: NMD3; OMA:NMD3 - orthologs

Gene location (Human)
Chr.	Chromosome 3 (human)
Band	3q26.1	Start	161,104,696 bp
Band	3q26.1	End	161,253,532 bp

Gene location (Mouse)
Chr.	Chromosome 3 (mouse)
Band	3|3 E1- E2	Start	69,629,318 bp
Band	3|3 E1- E2	End	69,663,706 bp
RNA expression pattern
Bgee	Human / Mouse (ortholog); Top expressed in: endothelial cell; germinal epithelium; skin of thigh; skin of hip; parotid gland; secondary oocyte; amniotic fluid; parietal pleura; visceral pleura; gingival epithelium / Top expressed in: embryo; secondary oocyte; embryo; epiblast; primary oocyte; primitive streak; zygote; tail of embryo; morula; Paneth cell; More reference expression data
BioGPS	n/a
Gene ontology
Molecular function	protein-macromolecule adaptor activity; RNA binding; ribosomal large subunit binding
Cellular component	nucleus; membrane; nucleolus; cytoplasm; nucleoplasm
Biological process	protein transport; ribosomal large subunit export from nucleus; positive regulation of RNA biosynthetic process; positive regulation of protein localization to nucleolus; positive regulation of protein binding; transport
Sources:Amigo / QuickGO
Orthologs
Species	Human	Mouse
Entrez	51068	97112
Ensembl	ENSG00000169251	ENSMUSG00000027787
UniProt	Q96D46	Q99L48
RefSeq (mRNA)	NM_015938; NM_001320227	NM_133787
RefSeq (protein)	NP_001307156; NP_057022	NP_598548
Location (UCSC)	Chr 3: 161.1 – 161.25 Mb	Chr 3: 69.63 – 69.66 Mb
PubMed search
- Wikidata
View/Edit Human	View/Edit Mouse

60S ribosomal export protein NMD3 is a protein that in humans is encoded by the NMD3 gene.

== Interactions ==
NMD3 has been shown to interact with XPO1.
