= RANBP3 =

Protein-coding gene in the species Homo sapiens

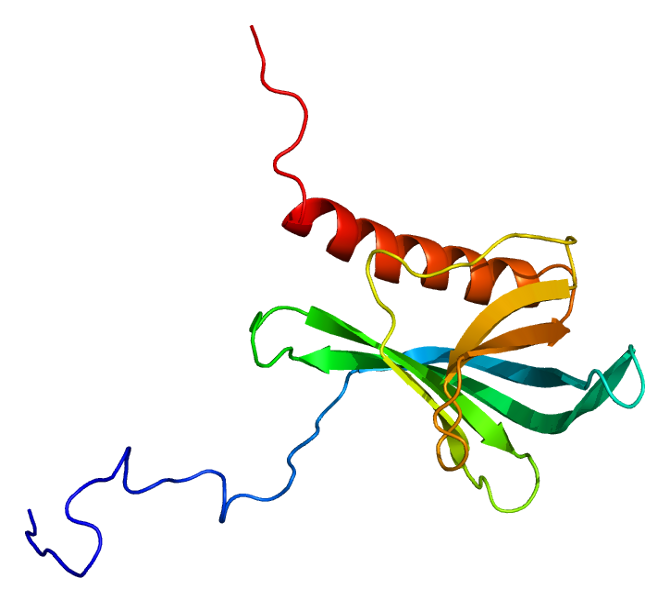
Available structures
PDB	Ortholog search: PDBe RCSB
PDB	List of PDB id codes 2CRF, 2Y8F, 2Y8G

Identifiers
- Aliases: RANBP3, RAN binding protein 3
- External IDs: OMIM: 603327; MGI: 1919060; HomoloGene: 136516; GeneCards: RANBP3; OMA:RANBP3 - orthologs

Gene location (Human)
Chr.	Chromosome 19 (human)
Band	19p13.3	Start	5,916,139 bp
Band	19p13.3	End	5,978,142 bp

Gene location (Mouse)
Chr.	Chromosome 17 (mouse)
Band	17|17 D	Start	56,980,294 bp
Band	17|17 D	End	57,018,764 bp
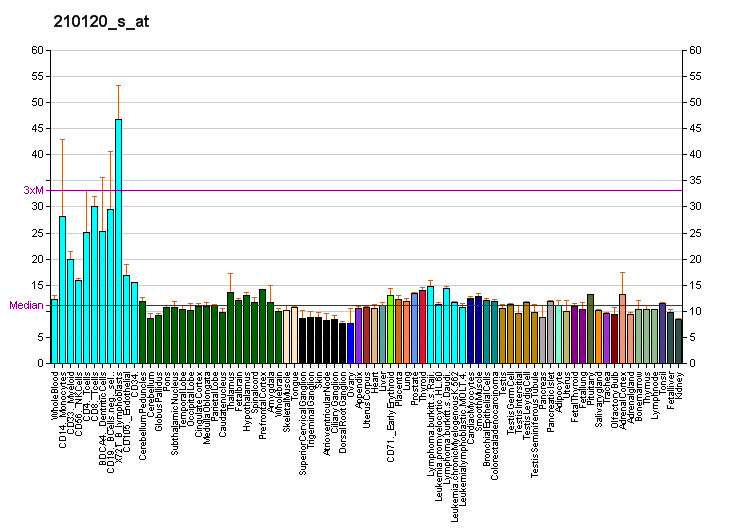

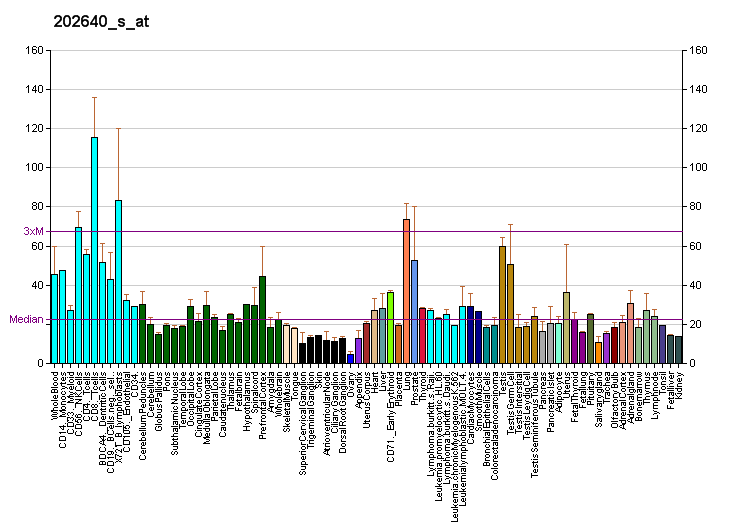

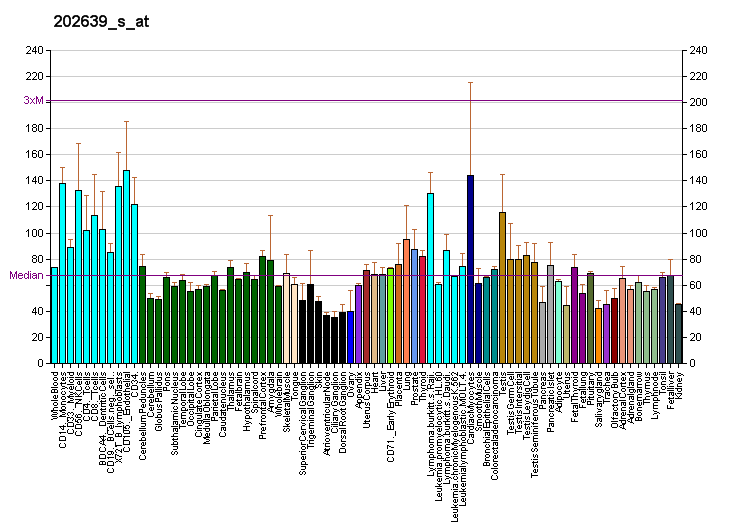
RNA expression pattern
Bgee	Human / Mouse (ortholog); Top expressed in: sural nerve; ventricular zone; ganglionic eminence; stromal cell of endometrium; gallbladder; left testis; muscle layer of sigmoid colon; gastric mucosa; popliteal artery; tibial arteries / Top expressed in: spermatocyte; ventricular zone; epiblast; Ileal epithelium; yolk sac; neural layer of retina; primitive streak; spermatid; secondary oocyte; dentate gyrus of hippocampal formation granule cell; More reference expression data
BioGPS	More reference expression data
Gene ontology
Molecular function	R-SMAD binding; protein binding; GTPase activator activity
Cellular component	nucleoplasm; nucleus; cytoplasm; centrosome; nuclear pore
Biological process	protein transport; intracellular transport; RNA export from nucleus; ubiquitin-dependent protein catabolic process; protein import into nucleus; spindle organization; positive regulation of GTPase activity; positive regulation of mitotic centrosome separation; G1/S transition of mitotic cell cycle; protein export from nucleus
Sources:Amigo / QuickGO
Orthologs
Species	Human	Mouse
Entrez	8498	71810
Ensembl	ENSG00000031823	ENSMUSG00000002372
UniProt	Q9H6Z4	Q9CT10
RefSeq (mRNA)	NM_001300865; NM_003624; NM_007320; NM_007321; NM_007322	NM_001252466; NM_001252467; NM_027933
RefSeq (protein)	NP_001287794; NP_003615; NP_015559; NP_015561	NP_001239395; NP_001239396; NP_082209
Location (UCSC)	Chr 19: 5.92 – 5.98 Mb	Chr 17: 56.98 – 57.02 Mb
PubMed search
- Wikidata
View/Edit Human	View/Edit Mouse

Ran-binding protein 3 is a protein that in humans is encoded by the RANBP3 gene.

This gene encodes a protein with a RanBD1 domain that is found in both the nucleus and cytoplasm. This protein plays a role in nuclear export as part of a heteromeric complex. Alternate transcriptional splice variants, encoding different isoforms, have been characterized.

== Interactions ==
RANBP3 has been shown to interact with RCC1 and XPO1.
