= RCC1 =

Protein found in humans

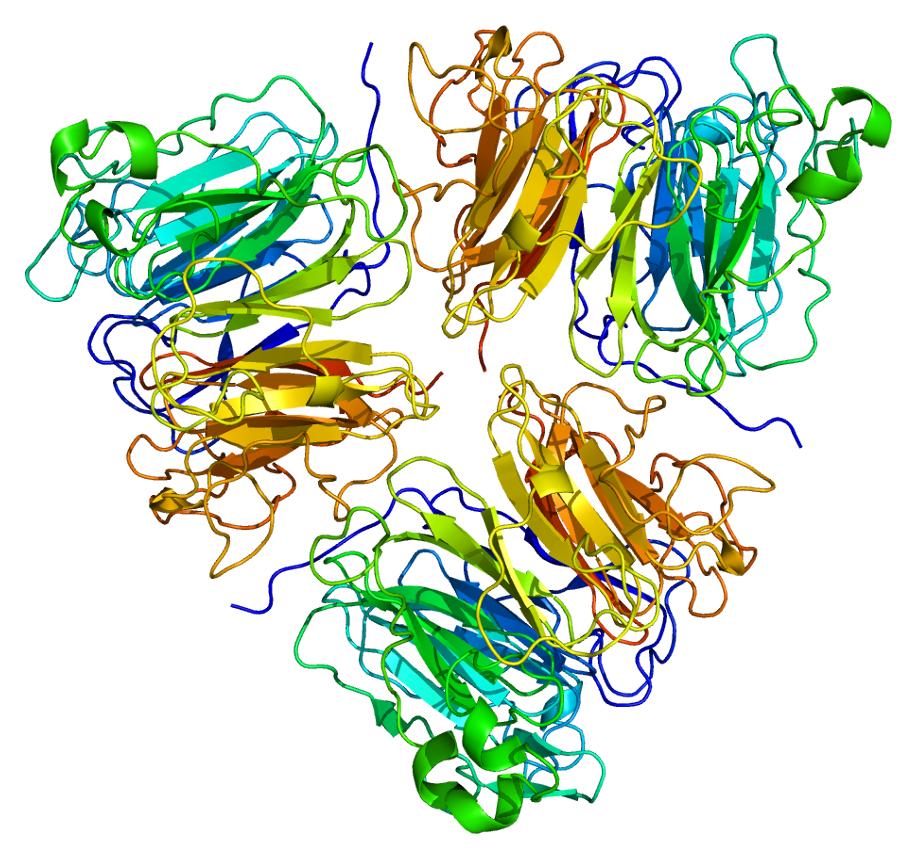

Identifiers
- Aliases: RCC1, CHC1, RCC1-I, SNHG3-regulator of chromosome condensation 1
- External IDs: OMIM: 179710; MGI: 1913989; GeneCards: RCC1
Available structures
| PDB | Ortholog search: PDBe RCSB |
| PDB | List of PDB id codes 1A12, 1I2M, 5E1O, 5E2A, 5E1M, 5E2B, 5E1D, 5E1B |

Gene location (Human)
| Chr. | Chromosome 1 (human) |
| Band | 1p35.3 | Start | 28,505,943 bp |
| Band | 1p35.3 | End | 28,539,300 bp |

Gene location (Mouse)
| Chr. | Chromosome 4 (mouse) |
| Band | 4|4 D2.3 | Start | 132,059,230 bp |
| Band | 4|4 D2.3 | End | 132,080,916 bp |
RNA expression pattern
| Bgee | Human / Mouse (ortholog); Top expressed in: right testis; left testis; ventricular zone; sperm; islet of Langerhans; ganglionic eminence; mucosa of transverse colon; stromal cell of endometrium; oocyte; rectum / Top expressed in: epiblast; spermatocyte; embryo; embryo; ventricular zone; yolk sac; spermatid; somite; primitive streak; fetal liver hematopoietic progenitor cell; More reference expression data |
| BioGPS | n/a |
Gene ontology
| Molecular function | DNA binding; guanyl-nucleotide exchange factor activity; histone binding; chromatin binding; protein binding; nucleosomal DNA binding; nucleosome binding; sulfate binding; protein heterodimerization activity |
| Cellular component | cytoplasm; nuclear membrane; nucleoplasm; condensed nuclear chromosome; nucleus; chromatin; chromosome; protein-containing complex |
| Biological process | chromosome segregation; G1 phase; mitotic spindle organization; cell division; spindle assembly; cell cycle; viral process; regulation of mitotic nuclear division; protein heterotetramerization; regulation of molecular function; G1/S transition of mitotic cell cycle |
Sources:Amigo / QuickGO
Orthologs
| Databases | NCBI: entry; OMA: entry |
| Species | Human | Mouse |
| Entrez | 1104 | 100088 |
| Ensembl | ENSG00000180198 | ENSMUSG00000028896 |
| UniProt | P18754; Q5T081 | Q8VE37 |
| RefSeq (mRNA) | NM_001048194; NM_001048195; NM_001048199; NM_001269; NM_001381865 NM_001381866 | NM_001197082; NM_133878 |
| RefSeq (protein) | NP_001041659; NP_001041660; NP_001041664; NP_001260; NP_001368794 NP_001368795; NP_001041664.1; NP_001260.1 | NP_001184011; NP_598639 |
| Location (UCSC) | Chr 1: 28.51 – 28.54 Mb | Chr 4: 132.06 – 132.08 Mb |
| PubMed search |
- Wikidata
| View/Edit Human | View/Edit Mouse |

Regulator of chromosome condensation 1, also known as RCC1, Ran guanine nucleotide exchange factor and RanGEF, is the name for a human gene and protein.

RCC1 also functions as a guanine nucleotide exchange factor for Ran GTPase.

== Interactions ==
RCC1 has been shown to interact with RANBP3 and Ran.
