= PLXNA3 =

Protein-coding gene in the species Homo sapiens

Identifiers
- Aliases: PLXNA3, 6.3, HSSEXGENE, PLXN3, PLXN4, XAP-6, plexin A3
- External IDs: OMIM: 300022; MGI: 107683; GeneCards: PLXNA3
Available structures
PDB	Ortholog search: PDBe RCSB
PDB	List of PDB id codes 3IG3

Gene location (Human)
Chr.	X chromosome (human)
Band	Xq28	Start	154,458,281 bp
Band	Xq28	End	154,477,779 bp

Gene location (Mouse)
Chr.	X chromosome (mouse)
Band	X A7.3|X 38.0 cM	Start	73,372,672 bp
Band	X A7.3|X 38.0 cM	End	73,388,295 bp
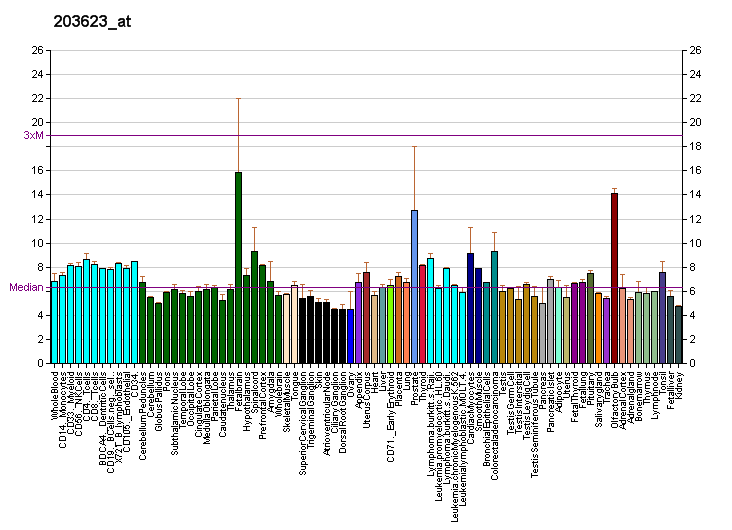
RNA expression pattern
Bgee	Human / Mouse (ortholog); Top expressed in: anterior pituitary; stromal cell of endometrium; right hemisphere of cerebellum; ganglionic eminence; left ovary; right ovary; tibial nerve; right coronary artery; right uterine tube; sural nerve / Top expressed in: ventricular zone; ganglionic eminence; genital tubercle; motor neuron; female urethra; lateral amygdaloid nucleus; Anterior olfactory nucleus; perirhinal cortex; entorhinal cortex; medial amygdaloid nucleus; More reference expression data
BioGPS	More reference expression data
Gene ontology
Molecular function	protein binding; transmembrane signaling receptor activity; semaphorin receptor activity
Cellular component	integral component of membrane; membrane; intracellular membrane-bounded organelle; plasma membrane; semaphorin receptor complex; cell junction; nucleus; integral component of plasma membrane
Biological process	regulation of axon extension involved in axon guidance; negative chemotaxis; negative regulation of axon extension involved in axon guidance; neuron projection extension; multicellular organism development; neuron projection guidance; branchiomotor neuron axon guidance; positive regulation of cytoskeleton organization; pyramidal neuron development; facial nerve structural organization; hippocampus development; trigeminal nerve structural organization; semaphorin-plexin signaling pathway; signal transduction; axon guidance; semaphorin-plexin signaling pathway involved in axon guidance; negative regulation of cell adhesion; regulation of cell shape; regulation of cell migration; regulation of GTPase activity; positive regulation of axonogenesis
Sources:Amigo / QuickGO
Orthologs
Databases	NCBI: entry; OMA: entry
Species	Human	Mouse
Entrez	55558	18846
Ensembl	ENSG00000130827	ENSMUSG00000031398
UniProt	P51805	P70208
RefSeq (mRNA)	NM_017514	NM_008883; NM_001358129
RefSeq (protein)	NP_059984	NP_032909; NP_001345058
Location (UCSC)	Chr X: 154.46 – 154.48 Mb	Chr X: 73.37 – 73.39 Mb
PubMed search
- Wikidata
View/Edit Human	View/Edit Mouse

Plexin-A3 is a protein that in humans is encoded by the PLXNA3 gene.
