= Selective inhibitor of nuclear export =

Class of anticancer drugs

Selective inhibitors of nuclear export (SINEs or SINE compounds) are drugs that block exportin 1 (XPO1 or CRM1), a protein involved in transport from the cell nucleus to the cytoplasm. This causes cell cycle arrest and cell death by apoptosis. Thus, SINE compounds are of interest as anticancer drugs; several are in development, and one (selinexor) has been approved for treatment of multiple myeloma as a drug of last resort.

The prototypical nuclear export inhibitor is leptomycin B, a natural product and secondary metabolite of Streptomyces bacteria. Although it is nonselective and too toxic for clinical use in humans, the discovery of its mechanism of action and antitumor properties prompted development of the SINE compounds.

== Mechanism of action ==
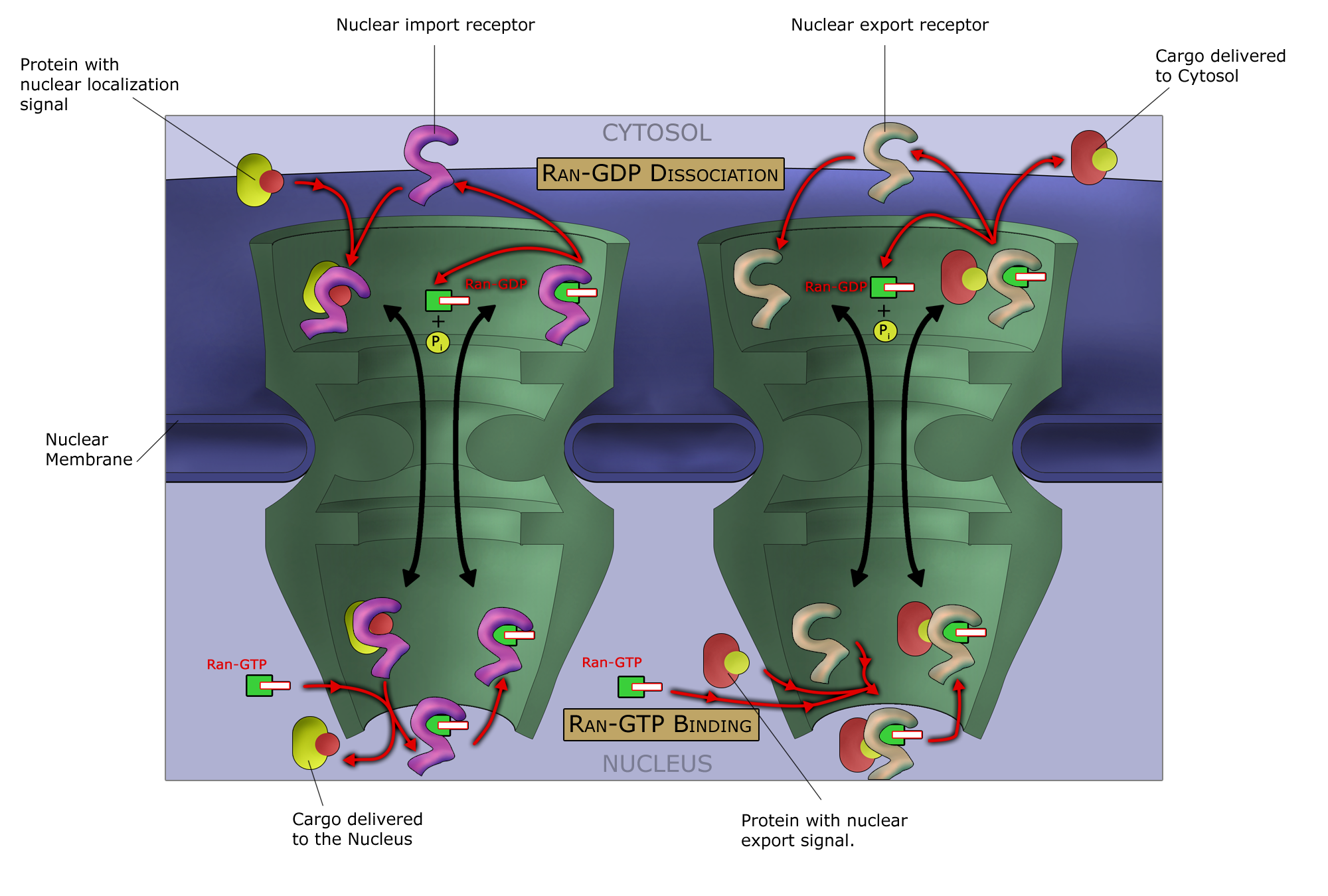
Schematic illustration of the Ran cycle of nuclear transport. SINE compounds inhibit this process at the nuclear export receptor (upper right).

SINEs work by binding to CRM1, a karyopherin which performs nuclear transport of hundreds of proteins—including tumor suppressors, oncogenes, and proteins involved in governing cell growth—from the cell nucleus to the cytoplasm. CRM1 it is often overexpressed and misregulated in cancer, and is the sole transporter of many proteins essential for cancer cell proliferation and spread. By restoring nuclear transport of these proteins to normal, SINEs lead to a buildup of tumor suppressors in the nucleus of malignant cells and reduce levels of oncogene products which drive cell growth, ultimately triggering apoptosis. In vitro, this effect appears to spare normal (non-malignant) cells. Nevertheless, because CRM1 is a pleiotropic gene, inhibiting it affects many different systems in the body, which causes a high rate of adverse reactions.

== Research ==
SINEs have been tested in several preclinical animal models of cancer, including pancreatic cancer, breast cancer, non-small-cell lung cancer, lymphomas, and acute and chronic leukemias. In humans, early clinical trials (phase I) have been conducted in non-Hodgkin lymphoma, blast crisis, and a wide range of advanced or refractory solid tumors, including colon cancer, head and neck cancer, melanoma, ovarian cancer, and prostate cancer. Compassionate use in patients with acute myeloid leukemia has also been reported.
