= XPO1 =

Protein found in humans

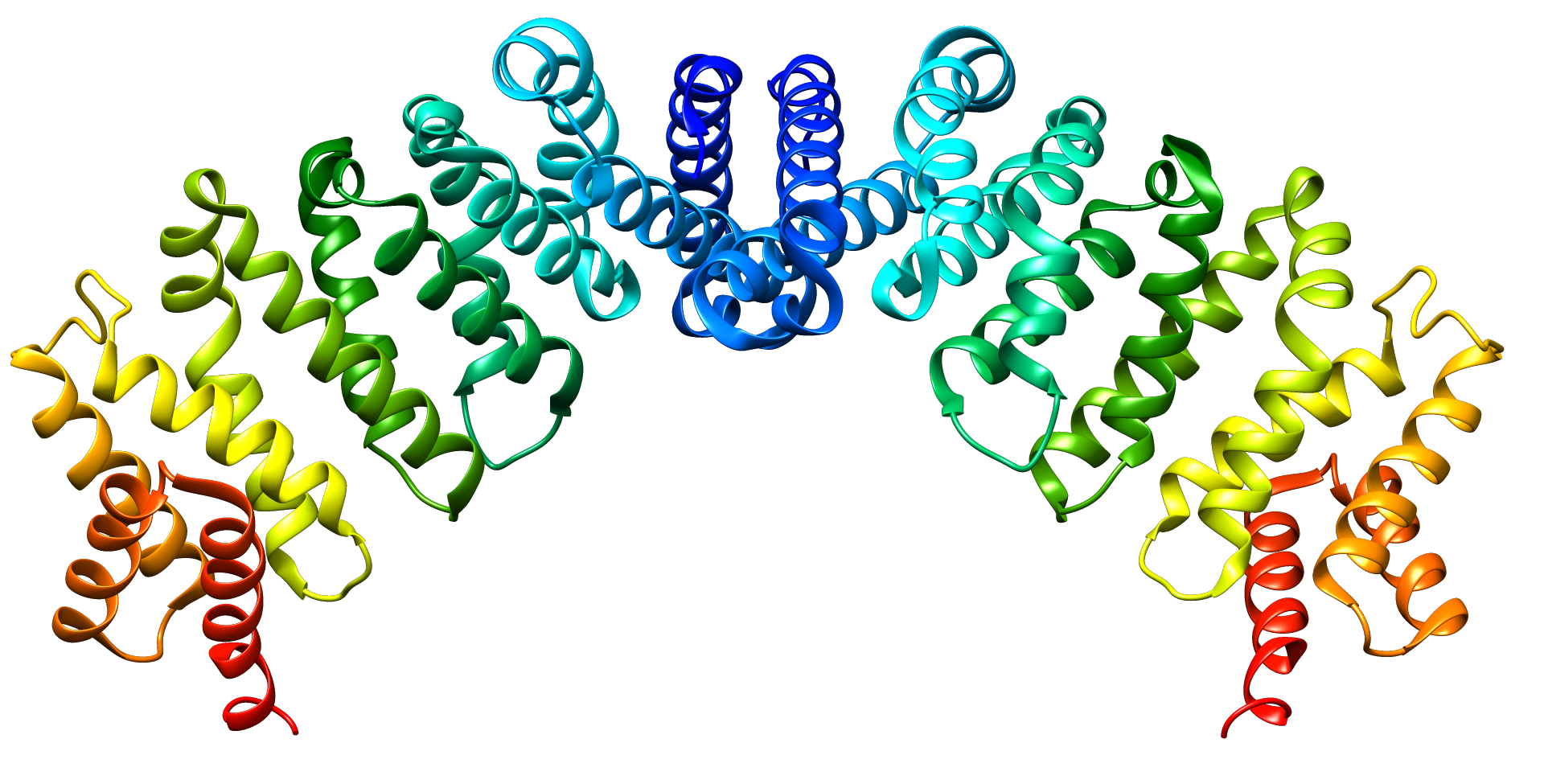

Identifiers
- Aliases: XPO1, CRM1, emb, exp1, exportin 1, CRM-1
- External IDs: OMIM: 602559; MGI: 2144013; GeneCards: XPO1
Available structures
PDB	Ortholog search: C9JV99 PDBe C9JV99 RCSB
PDB	List of PDB id codes 1W9C, 2L1L, 3GB8, 4BSM, 4BSN, 5DIS

Gene location (Human)
Chr.	Chromosome 2 (human)
Band	2p15	Start	61,476,032 bp
Band	2p15	End	61,538,741 bp

Gene location (Mouse)
Chr.	Chromosome 11 (mouse)
Band	11|11 A3.2	Start	23,206,041 bp
Band	11|11 A3.2	End	23,248,249 bp
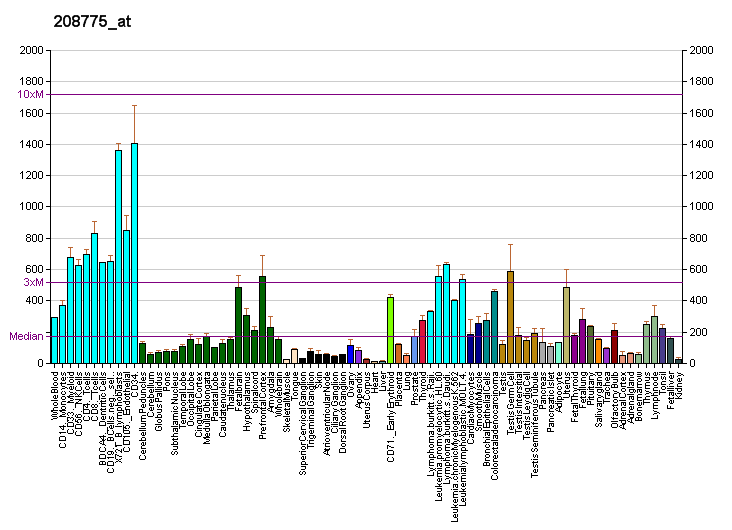
RNA expression pattern
Bgee	Human / Mouse (ortholog); Top expressed in: tibia; ventricular zone; germinal epithelium; epithelium of nasopharynx; parietal pleura; visceral pleura; embryo; skin of hip; trabecular bone; palpebral conjunctiva / Top expressed in: tail of embryo; primitive streak; genital tubercle; Gonadal ridge; dermis; abdominal wall; epiblast; human fetus; mandibular prominence; medullary collecting duct; More reference expression data
BioGPS	More reference expression data
Gene ontology
Molecular function	protein domain specific binding; transporter activity; protein binding; RNA binding; structural constituent of nuclear pore; nuclear export signal receptor activity
Cellular component	cytoplasm; Cajal body; nuclear membrane; membrane; intracellular membrane-bounded organelle; nuclear envelope; nucleoplasm; lamellae anulatae; nucleus; kinetochore; nucleolus; cytosol; host cell; protein-containing complex; ribonucleoprotein complex; intracellular anatomical structure
Biological process	ribosomal small subunit export from nucleus; intracellular transport of virus; regulation of centrosome duplication; mRNA transport; regulation of mRNA stability; negative regulation of transcription by RNA polymerase II; protein export from nucleus; regulation of protein catabolic process; protein localization to nucleus; protein transport; ribosomal large subunit export from nucleus; intracellular protein transport; viral process; sister chromatid cohesion; ribosomal subunit export from nucleus; regulation of protein export from nucleus; ribosome biogenesis; transport; nucleocytoplasmic transport
Sources:Amigo / QuickGO
Orthologs
Databases	NCBI: entry; OMA: entry
Species	Human	Mouse
Entrez	7514	103573
Ensembl	ENSG00000082898	ENSMUSG00000020290
UniProt	O14980	Q6P5F9
RefSeq (mRNA)	NM_003400	NM_001035226; NM_134014
RefSeq (protein)	NP_003391	NP_001030303; NP_598775
Location (UCSC)	Chr 2: 61.48 – 61.54 Mb	Chr 11: 23.21 – 23.25 Mb
PubMed search
- Wikidata
View/Edit Human	View/Edit Mouse

Exportin 1 (XPO1), also known as chromosomal region maintenance 1 (CRM1), is a eukaryotic protein that mediates the nuclear export of various proteins and RNAs.

== History ==
XPO1 (CRM1) originally was identified in the fission yeast Schizosaccharomyces pombe in a genetic screen, and investigators determined that it was involved in control of the chromosome structure. It was later shown to be the nuclear transport receptor for cargos with leucine-rich nuclear export signals (NES). The structural details of the interaction of XPO1 with its cargos were revealed two decades after the gene was identified.

== Function ==
XPO1 mediates NES-dependent protein transport. It exports hundreds of different proteins from the nucleus. XPO1 is involved in the nuclear export of ribosomal subunits. XPO1 plays a role in export of various RNAs including U snRNAs, rRNAs (as a part of ribosomal subunits), and some mRNAs.

== Medical relevance ==
XPO1 is involved in various viral infections. For example, it is required for the nuclear export of HIV-1 RNA in complex with the viral protein Rev, an event that is a crucial part of the infection cycle. XPO1 is affected in some cancer types and is therefore viewed as a target for development of anti-cancer drugs. Selinexor, a drug specifically targeting XPO1, was approved by the FDA for treatment of multiple myeloma.

== Interactions ==
XPO1 has been shown to interact with:

- APC,
- CDKN1B,
- CIITA,
- NMD3,
- Nucleoporin 62,
- RANBP1,
- RANBP3,
- Ran,
- SMARCB1, and
- p53.

== See also ==
- Karyopherin
- Importin
- Nuclear transport
- Nuclear export signal
