= CD109 =

Protein-coding gene in humans

Identifiers
- Aliases: CD109, CPAMD7, p180, r150, CD109 molecule
- External IDs: OMIM: 608859; MGI: 2445221; GeneCards: CD109

Gene location (Human)
Chr.	Chromosome 6 (human)
Band	6q13	Start	73,695,785 bp
Band	6q13	End	73,828,316 bp

Gene location (Mouse)
Chr.	Chromosome 9 (mouse)
Band	9|9 E1	Start	78,522,828 bp
Band	9|9 E1	End	78,623,535 bp
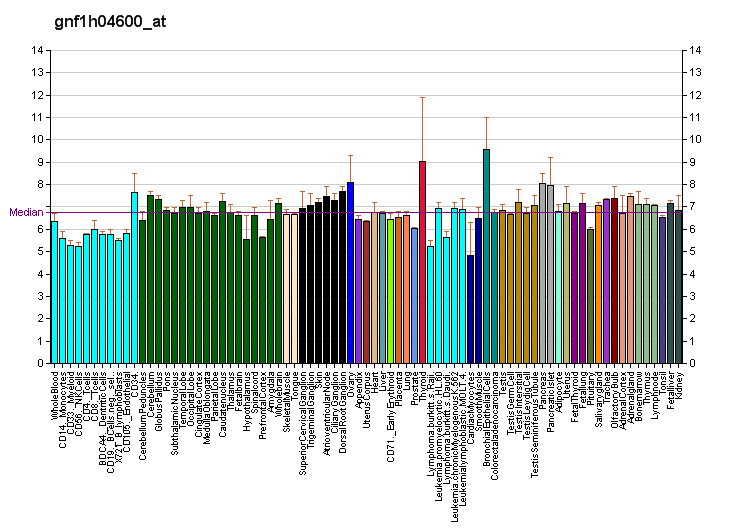

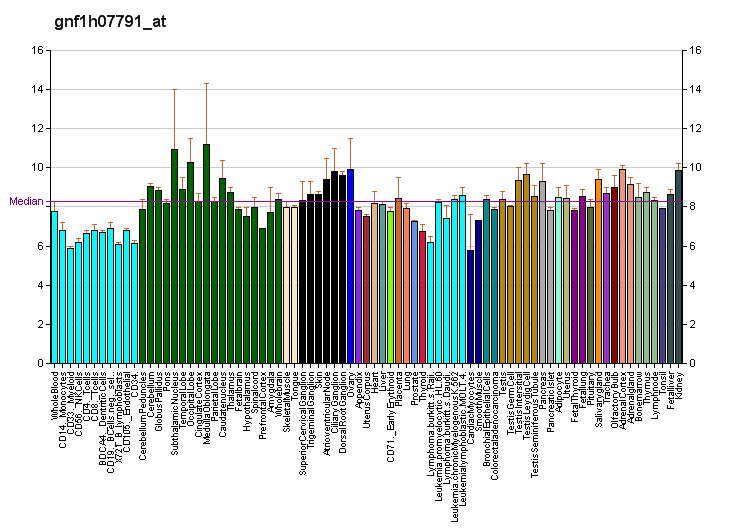

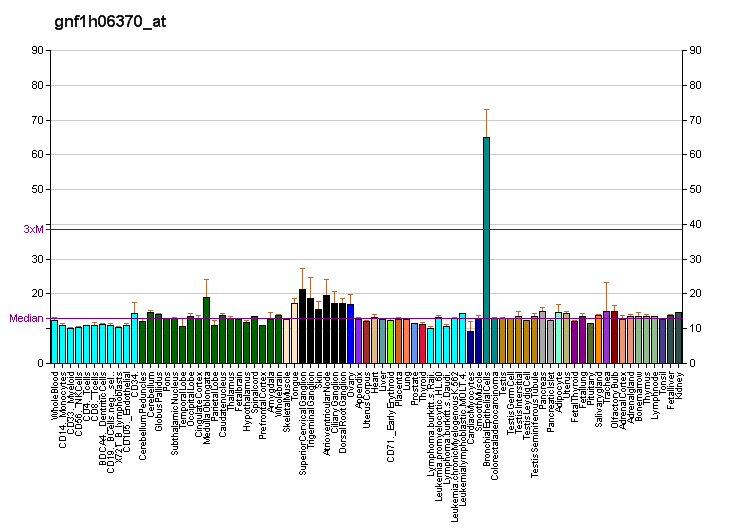
RNA expression pattern
Bgee	Human / Mouse (ortholog); Top expressed in: tibia; skin of arm; skin of thigh; skin of hip; synovial membrane; vulva; tendon of biceps brachii; cartilage tissue; nipple; gums / Top expressed in: skin of external ear; calvaria; spermatid; body of femur; skin of back; ankle; cornea; endothelial cell of lymphatic vessel; lip; stroma of bone marrow; More reference expression data
BioGPS	More reference expression data
Gene ontology
Molecular function	peptidase inhibitor activity; endopeptidase inhibitor activity; transforming growth factor beta binding; serine-type endopeptidase inhibitor activity
Cellular component	cell surface; anchored component of membrane; membrane; extracellular region; extracellular space; plasma membrane; platelet alpha granule membrane
Biological process	hair follicle development; negative regulation of protein phosphorylation; regulation of keratinocyte differentiation; osteoclast fusion; negative regulation of wound healing; negative regulation of peptidase activity; negative regulation of transforming growth factor beta receptor signaling pathway; negative regulation of keratinocyte proliferation; negative regulation of endopeptidase activity; platelet degranulation; C-terminal protein lipidation
Sources:Amigo / QuickGO
Orthologs
Databases	NCBI: entry; OMA: entry
Species	Human	Mouse
Entrez	135228	235505
Ensembl	ENSG00000156535	ENSMUSG00000046186
UniProt	Q6YHK3	Q8R422
RefSeq (mRNA)	NM_001159587; NM_001159588; NM_133493	NM_153098
RefSeq (protein)	NP_001153059; NP_001153060; NP_598000	NP_694738
Location (UCSC)	Chr 6: 73.7 – 73.83 Mb	Chr 9: 78.52 – 78.62 Mb
PubMed search
- Wikidata
View/Edit Human	View/Edit Mouse

CD109 (Cluster of Differentiation 109) is a human gene.

CD109 is a GPI-linked cell surface antigen expressed by CD34+ acute myeloid leukemia cell lines, T-cell lines, activated T lymphoblasts, endothelial cells, and activated platelets (Lin et al., 2002). In addition, the platelet-specific Gov antigen system (HPA15), implicated in refractoriness to platelet transfusion, neonatal alloimmune thrombocytopenia, and posttransfusion purpura, is carried by CD109 (Kelton et al., 1990; Lin et al., 2002).[supplied by OMIM]

== See also ==
- Cluster of differentiation
