= KPNB1 =

Protein-coding gene in the species Homo sapiens

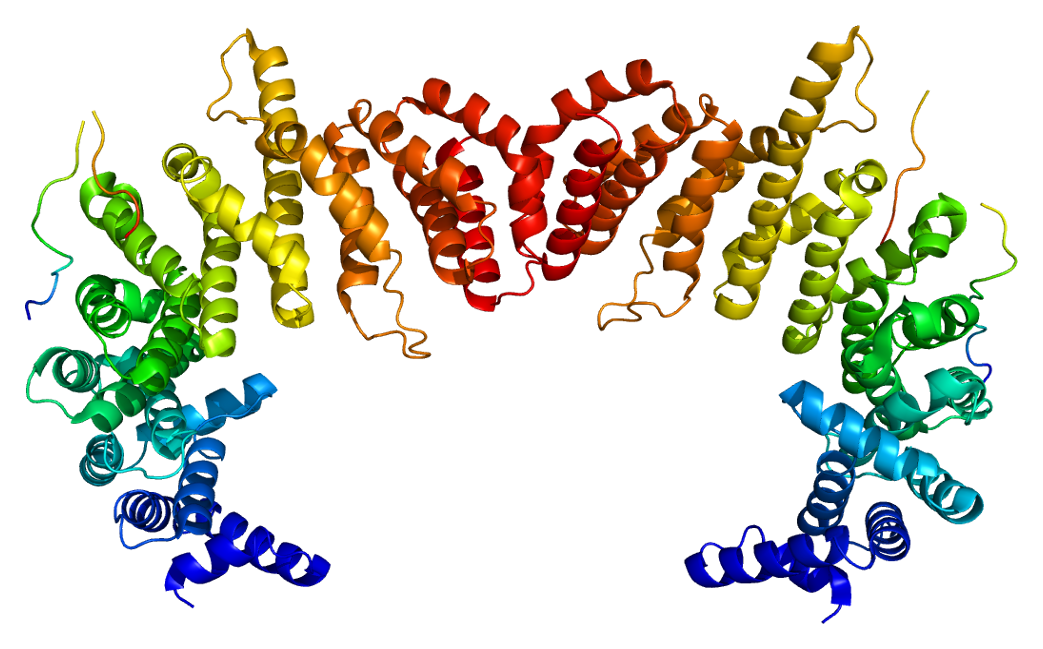

Identifiers
- Aliases: KPNB1, IMB1, IPO1, IPOB, Impnb, NTF97, karyopherin subunit beta 1
- External IDs: OMIM: 602738; MGI: 107532; GeneCards: KPNB1
Available structures
| PDB | Ortholog search: PDBe RCSB |
| PDB | List of PDB id codes 1F59, 1IBR, 1M5N, 1O6O, 1O6P, 1QGK, 1QGR, 2P8Q, 2Q5D, 2QNA, 3LWW, 3W5K |

Gene location (Human)
| Chr. | Chromosome 17 (human) |
| Band | 17q21.32 | Start | 47,649,476 bp |
| Band | 17q21.32 | End | 47,685,505 bp |

Gene location (Mouse)
| Chr. | Chromosome 11 (mouse) |
| Band | 11|11 D | Start | 97,050,540 bp |
| Band | 11|11 D | End | 97,078,707 bp |
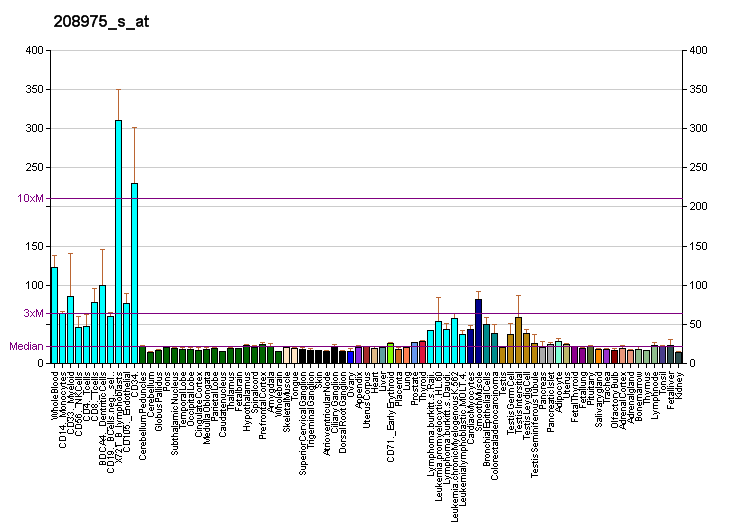

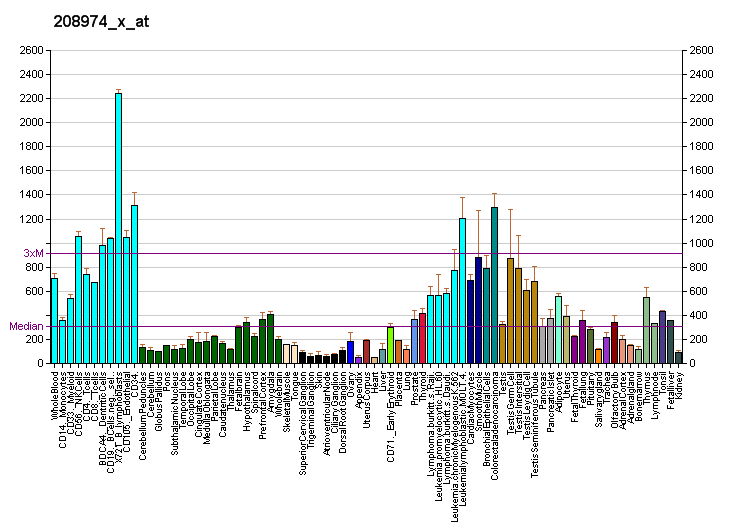

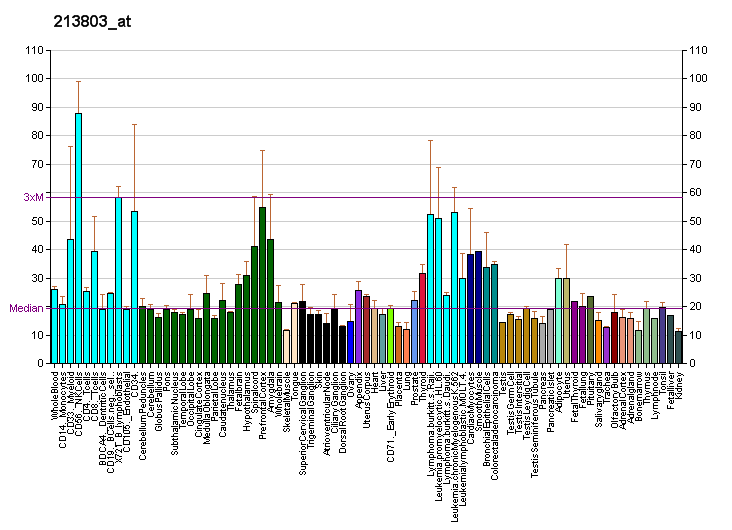
RNA expression pattern
| Bgee | Human / Mouse (ortholog); Top expressed in: buccal mucosa cell; ventricular zone; ganglionic eminence; optic nerve; secondary oocyte; islet of Langerhans; tendon of biceps brachii; stromal cell of endometrium; internal globus pallidus; appendix / Top expressed in: tail of embryo; condyle; fossa; epiblast; genital tubercle; primitive streak; medullary collecting duct; abdominal wall; ureter; ventricular zone; More reference expression data |
| BioGPS | More reference expression data |
Gene ontology
| Molecular function | Hsp90 protein binding; protein domain specific binding; zinc ion binding; protein binding; nuclear localization sequence binding; enzyme binding; RNA binding; importin-alpha family protein binding |
| Cellular component | nuclear membrane; membrane; nuclear periphery; nuclear pore; endoplasmic reticulum tubular network; nucleoplasm; extracellular exosome; nucleus; nuclear envelope; extracellular region; cytoplasm; cytosol; specific granule lumen; ficolin-1-rich granule lumen; host cell; cytoplasmic stress granule; protein-containing complex |
| Biological process | intracellular transport of virus; apoptotic DNA fragmentation; Ran protein signal transduction; establishment of protein localization; mitotic spindle assembly; protein transport; mitotic metaphase plate congression; intracellular protein transport; astral microtubule organization; mitotic chromosome movement towards spindle pole; establishment of mitotic spindle localization; NLS-bearing protein import into nucleus; modulation by virus of host cellular process; protein import into nucleus; ribosomal protein import into nucleus; viral process; neutrophil degranulation; regulation of cholesterol biosynthetic process; transport |
Sources:Amigo / QuickGO
Orthologs
| Databases | NCBI: entry; OMA: entry |
| Species | Human | Mouse |
| Entrez | 3837 | 16211 |
| Ensembl | ENSG00000108424 | ENSMUSG00000001440 |
| UniProt | Q14974 | P70168 |
| RefSeq (mRNA) | NM_002265; NM_001276453 | NM_008379 |
| RefSeq (protein) | NP_001263382; NP_002256 | NP_032405 |
| Location (UCSC) | Chr 17: 47.65 – 47.69 Mb | Chr 11: 97.05 – 97.08 Mb |
| PubMed search |
- Wikidata
| View/Edit Human | View/Edit Mouse |

Importin subunit beta-1 is a protein that in humans is encoded by the KPNB1 gene.

== Structure ==
The protein encoded by this gene is a member of the importin beta family.

An axon-localizing element within the 3′ untranslated region (UTR) of the Importin β1 transcript has been identified as necessary for its selective localization and translation in axons.

== Function ==
Nucleocytoplasmic transport, a signal- and energy-dependent process, takes place through nuclear pore complexes embedded in the nuclear envelope. The import of proteins containing a classical nuclear localization signal (NLS) requires the NLS import receptor, a heterodimer of importin alpha and beta subunits. Each of these subunits are part of the karyopherin family of proteins. Importin alpha binds the NLS-containing cargo in the cytoplasm and importin beta docks the complex at the cytoplasmic side of the nuclear pore complex. In the presence of nucleoside triphosphates and the small GTP binding protein Ran, the complex moves into the nuclear pore complex and the importin subunits dissociate. Importin alpha enters the nucleoplasm with its passenger protein and importin beta remains at the pore. Interactions between importin beta and the FG repeats of nucleoporins are essential in translocation through the pore complex.

In neurons of the peripheral nervous system, Importin β1 has an additional role in retrograde injury signaling. Following axonal injury, Importin β1 mRNA undergoes local translation within axons, contributing to the formation of signaling complexes that are transported retrogradely to the cell body. This localized protein synthesis enables Importin β1 to participate in cytoplasmic injury-response pathways independently of its essential housekeeping functions in nucleocytoplasmic transport.

== Clinical significance ==
Subcellular depletion of Importin β1 from axons of peripheral neurons attenuates injury-induced signaling to the cell body and delays functional recovery, demonstrating that local translation of Importin β1 is required for efficient retrograde signaling in injured neurons.

Similarly, subcellular depletion of the importin β1 3′UTR causes hippocampus-dependent memory deficits in mice, specific alteration of presynaptic long-term potentiation, and reduced local protein synthesis at mossy fiber terminals, revealing additional non-canonical roles for axonal importin β1 in presynaptic organization beyond growth and regeneration, for the establishment and long-term maintenance of neuronal circuits.

== Interactions ==
KPNB1 has been shown to interact with:

- KPNA3,
- Karyopherin alpha 1,
- Karyopherin alpha 2,
- Mothers against decapentaplegic homolog 3,
- NUP153
- NUP50,
- NUP98,
- Nucleoporin 62,
- P53,
- Parathyroid hormone-related protein,
- RANBP1,
- RANBP2,
- Ran (biology), and
- SMN1.
