= TNPO2 =

Protein-coding gene in the species Homo sapiens

Identifiers
- Aliases: TNPO2, IPO3, KPNB2B, TRN2, transportin 2
- External IDs: OMIM: 603002; MGI: 2384849; GeneCards: TNPO2

Gene location (Human)
Chr.	Chromosome 19 (human)
Band	19p13.13	Start	12,699,194 bp
Band	19p13.13	End	12,724,011 bp

Gene location (Mouse)
Chr.	Chromosome 8 (mouse)
Band	8|8 C3	Start	85,763,544 bp
Band	8|8 C3	End	85,784,212 bp
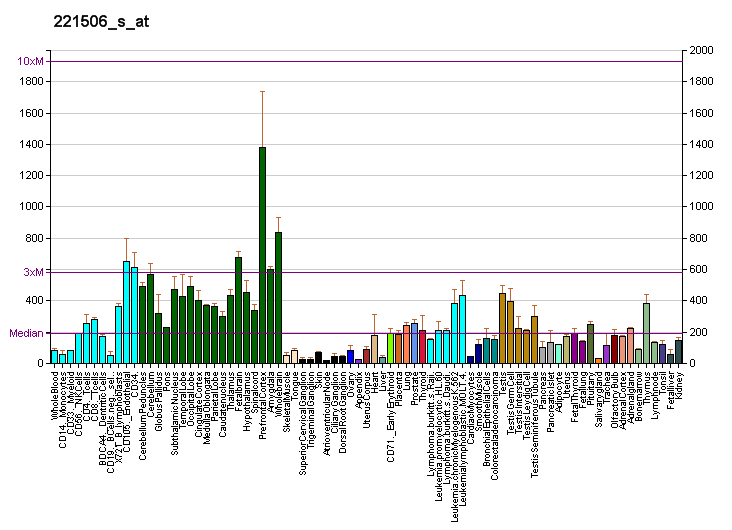

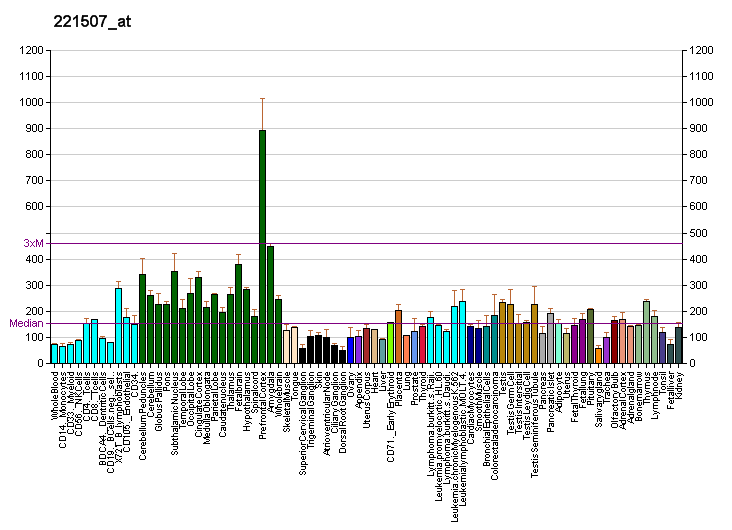

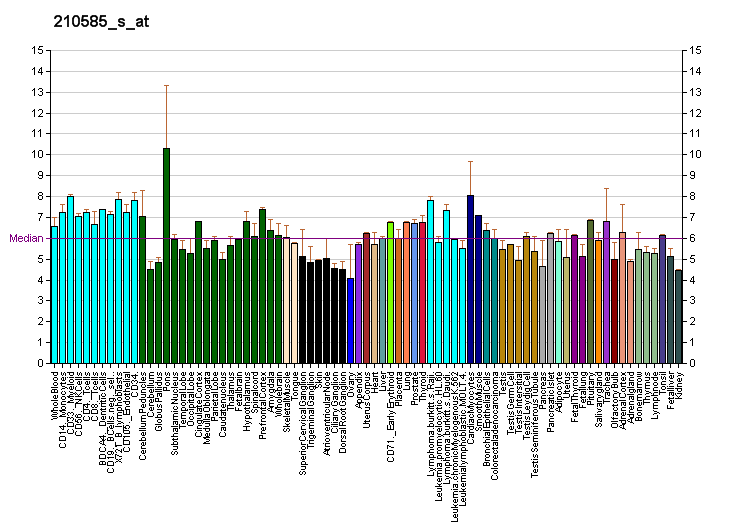
RNA expression pattern
Bgee	Human / Mouse (ortholog); Top expressed in: inferior olivary nucleus; dorsal motor nucleus of vagus nerve; entorhinal cortex; lateral nuclear group of thalamus; pons; Brodmann area 46; nipple; ventral tegmental area; superior vestibular nucleus; orbitofrontal cortex / Top expressed in: perirhinal cortex; entorhinal cortex; CA3 field; visual cortex; Ileal epithelium; corneal stroma; primary visual cortex; superior frontal gyrus; dentate gyrus of hippocampal formation granule cell; lactiferous gland; More reference expression data
BioGPS	More reference expression data
Gene ontology
Molecular function	protein binding; nuclear localization sequence binding
Cellular component	nuclear membrane; nuclear periphery; nucleus; cytoplasm
Biological process	protein transport; intracellular protein transport; ribosomal protein import into nucleus; NLS-bearing protein import into nucleus; protein import into nucleus
Sources:Amigo / QuickGO
Orthologs
Databases	NCBI: entry; OMA: entry
Species	Human	Mouse
Entrez	30000	212999
Ensembl	ENSG00000105576	ENSMUSG00000031691
UniProt	O14787	Q99LG2
RefSeq (mRNA)	NM_013433; NM_001136195; NM_001136196	NM_001122843; NM_145390; NM_001364031; NM_001364032; NM_001364033 NM_001364034; NM_001379096
RefSeq (protein)	NP_001129667; NP_001129668; NP_038461; NP_001369165; NP_001369166 NP_001369167; NP_001369168; NP_001369169; NP_001369170; NP_001369171; NP_001369172; NP_001129667.1; NP_038461.2	NP_001116315; NP_663365; NP_001350960; NP_001350961; NP_001350962 NP_001350963; NP_001366025
Location (UCSC)	Chr 19: 12.7 – 12.72 Mb	Chr 8: 85.76 – 85.78 Mb
PubMed search
- Wikidata
View/Edit Human	View/Edit Mouse

Transportin-2 is a protein that in humans is encoded by the TNPO2 gene.

== Interactions ==
TNPO2 has been shown to interact with NXF1, NUP98 and Ran (biology).
