= Nucleoporin 50 =

Protein-coding gene in the species Homo sapiens

NUP50

Identifiers
- Aliases: NUP50, NPAP60, NPAP60L, nucleoporin 50kDa, nucleoporin 50
- External IDs: OMIM: 604646; MGI: 1351502; GeneCards: NUP50
Available structures
PDB	Ortholog search: PDBe RCSB
PDB	List of PDB id codes 2EC1, 3TJ3

Gene location (Human)
Chr.	Chromosome 22 (human)
Band	22q13.31	Start	45,163,925 bp
Band	22q13.31	End	45,188,017 bp

Gene location (Mouse)
Chr.	Chromosome 15 (mouse)
Band	15 E2|15 40.25 cM	Start	84,807,612 bp
Band	15 E2|15 40.25 cM	End	84,827,164 bp
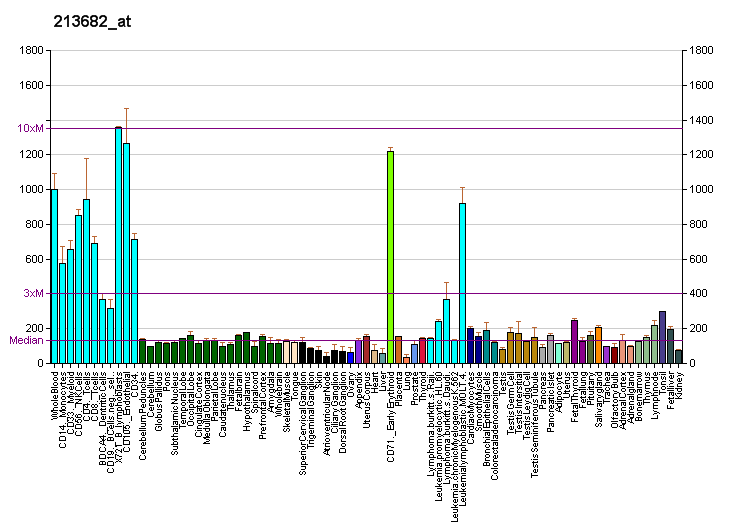

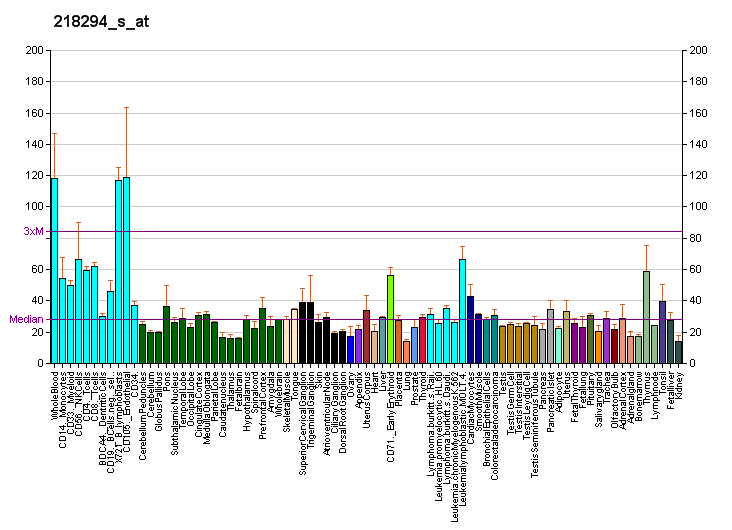

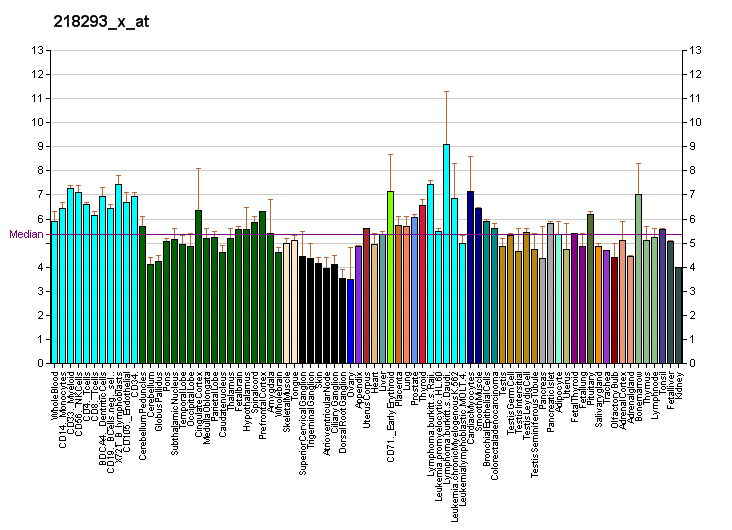
RNA expression pattern
Bgee	Human / Mouse (ortholog); Top expressed in: epithelium of nasopharynx; nasal epithelium; mucosa of paranasal sinus; bone marrow; bone marrow cell; endothelial cell; trabecular bone; Epithelium of choroid plexus; blood; sperm / Top expressed in: Ileal epithelium; zygote; seminiferous tubule; primitive streak; spermatid; secondary oocyte; epiblast; tail of embryo; genital tubercle; yolk sac; More reference expression data
BioGPS	More reference expression data
Gene ontology
Molecular function	protein binding; GTPase activator activity
Cellular component	nuclear membrane; membrane; nucleoplasm; nucleus; intracellular membrane-bounded organelle; nuclear pore; cytoplasm; centrosome; host cell
Biological process	mRNA transport; intracellular transport; protein transport; viral process; protein import into nucleus; mRNA export from nucleus; positive regulation of GTPase activity; regulation of glycolytic process; tRNA export from nucleus; protein sumoylation; viral transcription; regulation of gene silencing by miRNA; intracellular transport of virus; regulation of cellular response to heat
Sources:Amigo / QuickGO
Orthologs
Databases	NCBI: entry; OMA: entry
Species	Human	Mouse
Entrez	10762	18141
Ensembl	ENSG00000093000	ENSMUSG00000016619
UniProt	Q9UKX7	Q9JIH2
RefSeq (mRNA)	NM_007172; NM_153645; NM_153684	NM_016714
RefSeq (protein)	NP_009103; NP_705931	NP_057923
Location (UCSC)	Chr 22: 45.16 – 45.19 Mb	Chr 15: 84.81 – 84.83 Mb
PubMed search
- Wikidata
View/Edit Human	View/Edit Mouse

Nucleoporin 50 (Nup50) is a protein that in humans is encoded by the NUP50 gene.

The nuclear pore complex is a massive structure that extends across the nuclear envelope, forming a gateway that regulates the flow of macromolecules between the nucleus and the cytoplasm. Nucleoporins are the main components of the nuclear pore complex in eukaryotic cells. The protein encoded by this gene is a member of the FG-repeat containing nucleoporins that functions as a soluble cofactor in importin-alpha:beta-mediated nuclear protein import. Pseudogenes of this gene are found on chromosomes 5, 6, and 14. Two transcript variants encoding different isoforms have been found for this gene.

== Interactions ==
NUP50 has been shown to interact with KPNB1 and CDKN1B.

A variant of NUP50 a nucleopore basket protein, is associated with sporadic ALS. Its dysfunction precedes the mislocation of TDP-43 from the nucleus to the cytoplasm.
