= Nucleoporin 35 =

Protein-coding gene in the species Homo sapiens

NUP35
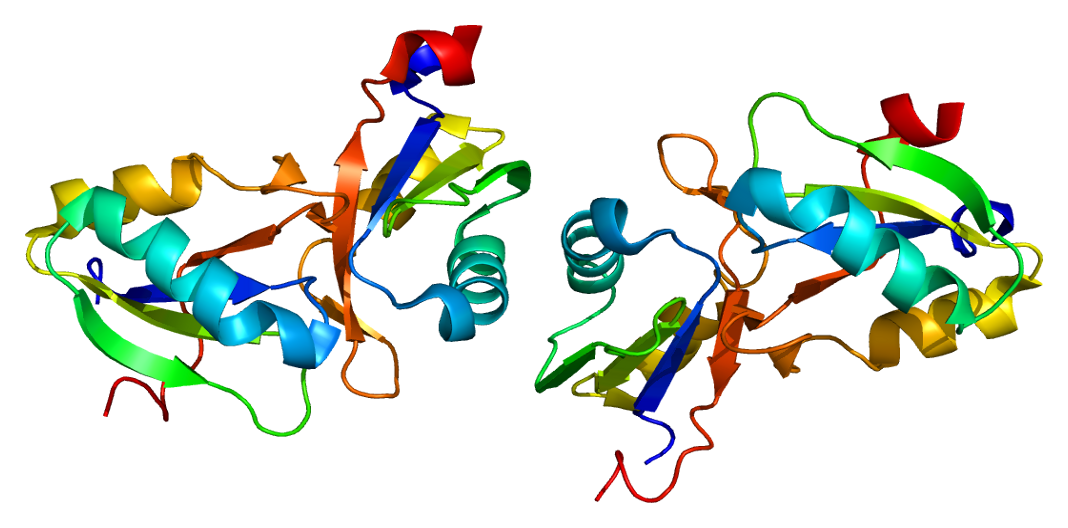

Identifiers
- Aliases: NUP35, MP-44, MP44, NP44, NUP53, nucleoporin 35kDa, nucleoporin 35
- External IDs: OMIM: 608140; MGI: 1916732; GeneCards: NUP35
Available structures
PDB	Ortholog search: PDBe RCSB
PDB	List of PDB id codes 4LIR

Gene location (Human)
Chr.	Chromosome 2 (human)
Band	2q32.1	Start	183,117,513 bp
Band	2q32.1	End	183,161,680 bp

Gene location (Mouse)
Chr.	Chromosome 2 (mouse)
Band	2|2 C3	Start	80,447,580 bp
Band	2|2 C3	End	80,489,250 bp
RNA expression pattern
Bgee	Human / Mouse (ortholog); Top expressed in: oocyte; secondary oocyte; sperm; ventricular zone; pancreatic epithelial cell; gonad; Achilles tendon; cartilage tissue; islet of Langerhans; ganglionic eminence / Top expressed in: secondary oocyte; zygote; primary oocyte; morula; yolk sac; epiblast; tail of embryo; genital tubercle; embryo; embryo; More reference expression data
BioGPS	n/a
Gene ontology
Molecular function	single-stranded DNA binding; protein binding; phospholipid binding; nucleic acid binding; structural constituent of nuclear pore
Cellular component	nuclear lamina; nuclear membrane; nuclear envelope; membrane; plasma membrane; nuclear pore; nucleoplasm; nuclear pore central transport channel; nuclear pore nuclear basket; nucleus; host cell
Biological process	mRNA transport; regulation of transcription, DNA-templated; protein transport; viral process; nuclear pore organization; NLS-bearing protein import into nucleus; mRNA export from nucleus; nucleocytoplasmic transport; regulation of glycolytic process; tRNA export from nucleus; protein sumoylation; viral transcription; regulation of gene silencing by miRNA; intracellular transport of virus; regulation of cellular response to heat
Sources:Amigo / QuickGO
Orthologs
Databases	NCBI: entry; OMA: entry
Species	Human	Mouse
Entrez	129401	69482
Ensembl	ENSG00000163002	ENSMUSG00000026999
UniProt	Q8NFH5	Q8R4R6
RefSeq (mRNA)	NM_001008544; NM_001287584; NM_001287585; NM_138285	NM_001190179; NM_027091
RefSeq (protein)	NP_001274513; NP_001274514; NP_612142	NP_001177108; NP_081367
Location (UCSC)	Chr 2: 183.12 – 183.16 Mb	Chr 2: 80.45 – 80.49 Mb
PubMed search
- Wikidata
View/Edit Human	View/Edit Mouse

Nucleoporin 35 (Nup35) is a protein that in humans is encoded by the NUP35 gene.

== Background ==
This gene encodes a member of the nucleoporin family. The protein is localized to the nuclear rim and is part of the nuclear pore complex (NPC). All molecules entering or leaving the nucleus either diffuse through or are actively transported by the NPC.
