= Aladin (protein) =

Nuclear envelope protein

AAAS

Identifiers
- Aliases: AAAS, AAA, AAASb, ADRACALA, ADRACALIN, ALADIN, GL003, aladin WD repeat nucleoporin
- External IDs: OMIM: 605378; MGI: 2443767; GeneCards: AAAS

Gene location (Human)
Chr.	Chromosome 12 (human)
Band	12q13.13	Start	53,307,456 bp
Band	12q13.13	End	53,324,864 bp

Gene location (Mouse)
Chr.	Chromosome 15 (mouse)
Band	15|15 F3	Start	102,246,687 bp
Band	15|15 F3	End	102,259,206 bp
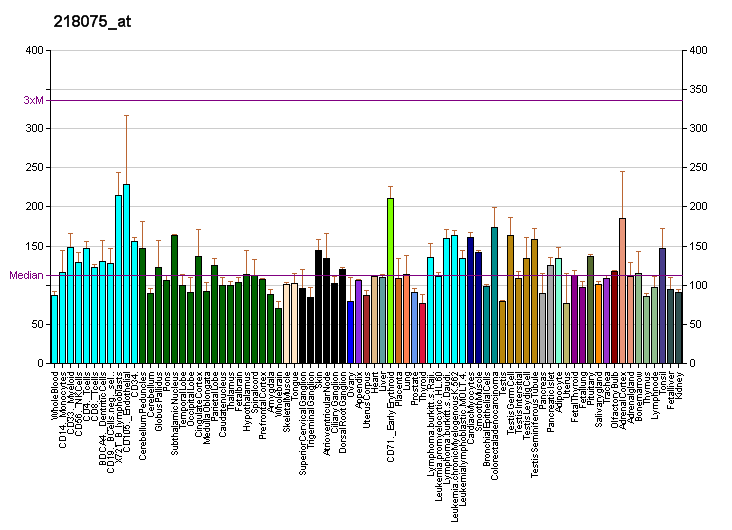
RNA expression pattern
Bgee	Human / Mouse (ortholog); Top expressed in: right adrenal cortex; right uterine tube; anterior pituitary; left adrenal cortex; apex of heart; right testis; ganglionic eminence; left testis; muscle layer of sigmoid colon; ventricular zone / Top expressed in: tail of embryo; yolk sac; genital tubercle; embryo; morula; blastocyst; spermatocyte; spermatid; embryo; epiblast; More reference expression data
BioGPS	More reference expression data
Gene ontology
Molecular function	molecular function
Cellular component	centrosome; nuclear membrane; nuclear envelope; membrane; nuclear pore; nucleoplasm; nucleus; cytosol; host cell; spindle pole; mitotic spindle; cytoplasm; cytoskeleton
Biological process	regulation of nucleocytoplasmic transport; mRNA transport; viral transcription; learning; protein sumoylation; mitotic nuclear membrane disassembly; nucleocytoplasmic transport; regulation of cellular response to heat; protein transport; fertilization; viral process; intracellular transport of virus; tRNA export from nucleus; mRNA export from nucleus; regulation of gene silencing by miRNA; regulation of glycolytic process; transport; microtubule bundle formation; mitotic spindle assembly
Sources:Amigo / QuickGO
Orthologs
Databases	NCBI: entry; OMA: entry
Species	Human	Mouse
Entrez	8086	223921
Ensembl	ENSG00000094914	ENSMUSG00000036678
UniProt	Q9NRG9	P58742
RefSeq (mRNA)	NM_001173466; NM_015665	NM_153416
RefSeq (protein)	NP_001166937; NP_056480	NP_700465
Location (UCSC)	Chr 12: 53.31 – 53.32 Mb	Chr 15: 102.25 – 102.26 Mb
PubMed search
- Wikidata
View/Edit Human	View/Edit Mouse

Aladin, also known as adracalin, is a nuclear envelope protein that in humans is encoded by the AAAS gene. It is named after the achalasia–addisonianism–alacrima syndrome (triple A syndrome) which occurs when the gene is mutated.

== Function ==
Aladin is a component of the nuclear pore complex, to which it is attached by nucleoporin NDC1. Mutant aladin causes selective failure of nuclear protein import and hypersensitivity to oxidative stress. Mutant aladin also causes decreased nuclear import of aprataxin, a repair protein for single-strand breaks, and DNA ligase I, employed in DNA base excision repair. These decreases in DNA repair proteins may increase the susceptibility of cells to oxidative stress by allowing accumulation of oxidative DNA damages that trigger cell death.

== Clinical significance ==
Mutations in the AAAS gene are responsible for Triple A syndrome (also known as Allgrove Syndrome). Triple-A syndrome is an autosomal recessive neuroendocrinological disease.

Aladin is also employed in specific oocyte meiotic stages, including spindle assembly and spindle positioning. Female mice homozygously null for aladin are sterile.
