= SENP2 =

Protein-coding gene in the species Homo sapiens

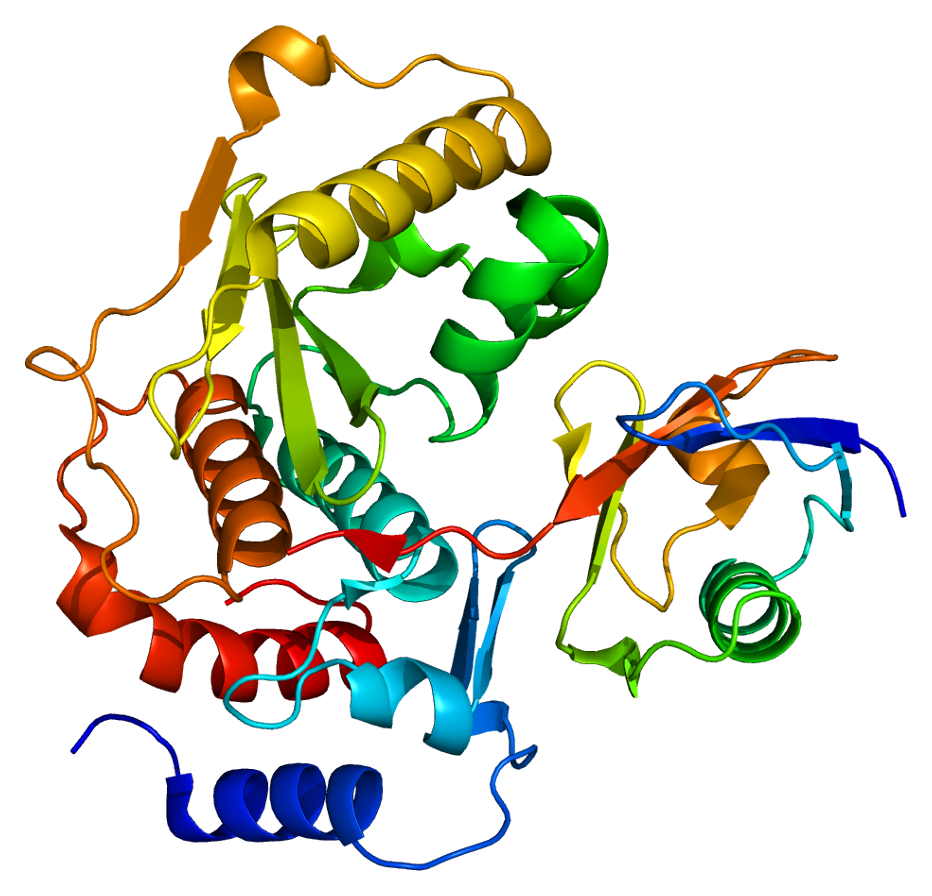

Identifiers
- Aliases: SENP2, AXAM2, SMT3IP2, SUMO1/sentrin/SMT3 specific peptidase 2, SUMO specific peptidase 2
- External IDs: OMIM: 608261; MGI: 1923076; GeneCards: SENP2
Available structures
PDB	Ortholog search: PDBe RCSB
PDB	List of PDB id codes 1TGZ, 1TH0, 2IO0, 2IO1, 2IO2, 2IO3, 3ZO5, 5AEK

Gene location (Human)
Chr.	Chromosome 3 (human)
Band	3q27.2	Start	185,582,496 bp
Band	3q27.2	End	185,633,551 bp

Gene location (Mouse)
Chr.	Chromosome 16 (mouse)
Band	16|16 B1	Start	21,828,234 bp
Band	16|16 B1	End	21,868,019 bp
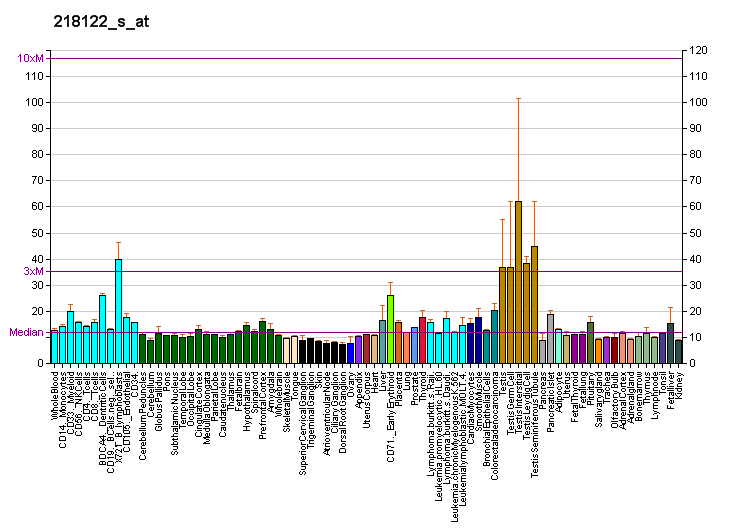
RNA expression pattern
Bgee	Human / Mouse (ortholog); Top expressed in: Achilles tendon; epithelium of colon; sural nerve; left testis; right testis; gastrocnemius muscle; corpus callosum; ventricular zone; islet of Langerhans; prefrontal cortex / Top expressed in: spermatocyte; seminiferous tubule; spermatid; granulocyte; fetal liver hematopoietic progenitor cell; neural layer of retina; epiblast; olfactory tubercle; visual cortex; somite; More reference expression data
BioGPS	More reference expression data
Gene ontology
Molecular function	cysteine-type peptidase activity; endopeptidase activity; peptidase activity; protein binding; hydrolase activity; SUMO-specific endopeptidase activity; protein domain specific binding
Cellular component	cytoplasm; nuclear membrane; membrane; nuclear pore; nucleoplasm; nucleus; cytosol; nuclear body; PML body; cytoplasmic vesicle
Biological process	mRNA transport; Wnt signaling pathway; protein sumoylation; proteolysis; negative regulation of protein ubiquitination; regulation of Wnt signaling pathway; protein destabilization; protein transport; positive regulation of protein ubiquitination; positive regulation of protein phosphorylation; development of the heart; dorsal/ventral axis specification; protein desumoylation; negative regulation of protein binding; regulation of DNA endoreduplication; negative regulation of chromatin binding; negative regulation of DNA damage response, signal transduction by p53 class mediator; fat cell differentiation; positive regulation of transcription by RNA polymerase II; regulation of protein metabolic process; trophoblast giant cell differentiation; labyrinthine layer development; spongiotrophoblast layer development; negative regulation of signal transduction by p53 class mediator; regulation of G1/S transition of mitotic cell cycle
Sources:Amigo / QuickGO
Orthologs
Databases	NCBI: entry; OMA: entry
Species	Human	Mouse
Entrez	59343	75826
Ensembl	ENSG00000163904	ENSMUSG00000022855
UniProt	Q9HC62	Q91ZX6
RefSeq (mRNA)	NM_021627	NM_029457; NM_001357424
RefSeq (protein)	NP_067640	NP_083733; NP_001344353
Location (UCSC)	Chr 3: 185.58 – 185.63 Mb	Chr 16: 21.83 – 21.87 Mb
PubMed search
- Wikidata
View/Edit Human	View/Edit Mouse

Sentrin-specific protease 2 is an enzyme that in humans is encoded by the SENP2 gene.

== Function ==
SUMO1 (UBL1; MIM 601912) is a small ubiquitin-like protein that can be covalently conjugated to other proteins. SENP2 is one of a group of protease enzymes that process newly synthesized SUMO1 into the conjugatable form and catalyze the deconjugation of SUMO1-containing species.[supplied by OMIM]

== Interactions ==
SENP2 has been shown to interact with NUP153.
