= Triple-A syndrome =

Triple A syndrome
- Other names: Achalasia–addisonianism–alacrima syndrome or Allgrove syndrome
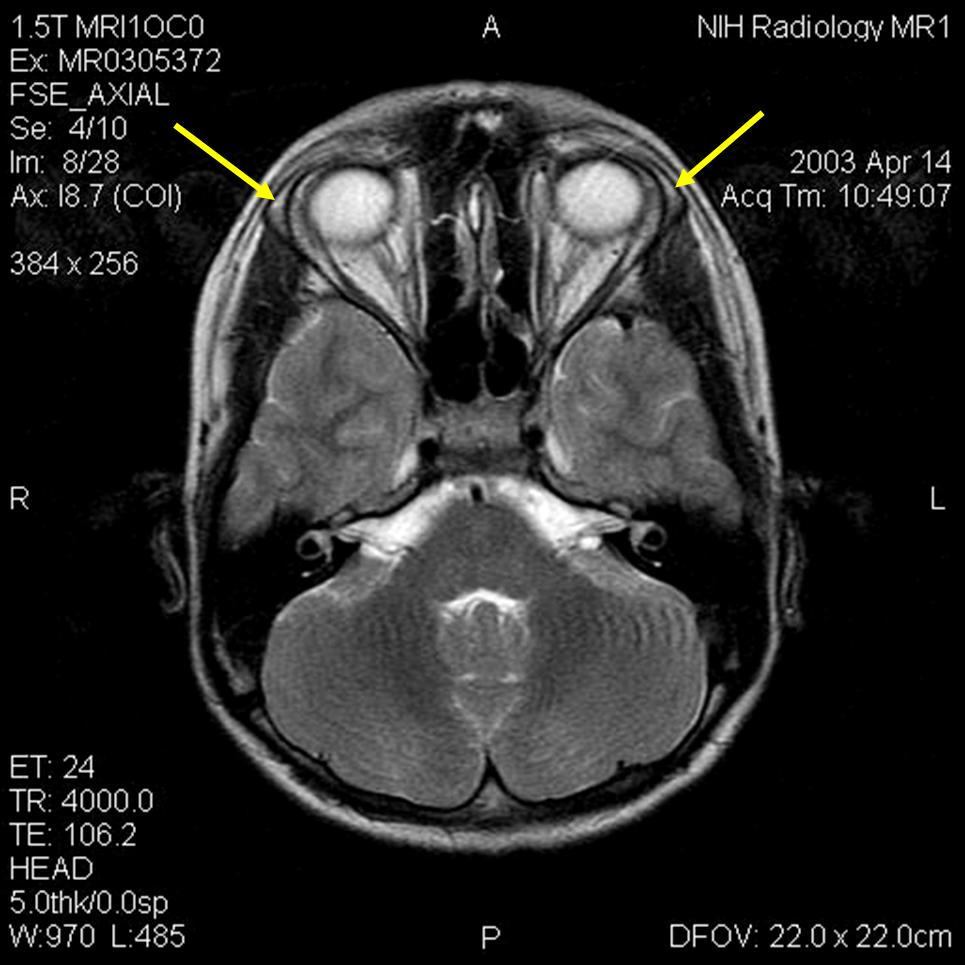
- MRI of the brain of 12-year-old boy with triple-A syndrome showing hypoplastic lacrimal glands (yellow arrows)
- Specialty: Endocrinology
- Frequency: 0.0001%

Triple-A syndrome or AAA syndrome is a rare autosomal recessive congenital disorder. In most cases, there is no family history of AAA syndrome. The syndrome was first identified by Jeremy Allgrove and colleagues in 1978; since then just over 100 cases have been reported. The syndrome is called Triple-A due to the manifestation of the illness which includes achalasia (a dysfunction of the esophagus), addisonianism (adrenal insufficiency of primary type), and alacrima (insufficiency of tears). Alacrima is usually the earliest manifestation. Neurodegeneration or atrophy of the nerve cells and autonomic dysfunction may be seen in the disorder; therefore, some have suggested the disorder be called 4A syndrome. It is a progressive disorder that can take years to develop the full-blown clinical picture. The disorder also has variability and heterogeneity in presentation.

== Presentation ==
Individuals affected by AAA have adrenal insufficiency/Addison's disease due to ACTH resistance, alacrima (absence of tear secretion), and achalasia (a failure of a ring of muscle fibers in the lower part of the esophagus to relax) called the lower esophageal sphincter at the cardia (very upper portion of the stomach). The esophagus is the tube that carries food from the mouth to the stomach. Achalasia delays food going to the stomach and causes dilation of the thoracic esophagus. There may also be signs of autonomic dysfunction, such as pupillary abnormalities, an abnormal reaction to intradermal histamine, abnormal sweating, orthostatic hypotension (low blood pressure with standing), and disturbances of the heart rate. Unexplained hypoglycemia (low blood sugar) is often mentioned as an early sign. The disorder has also been associated with mild intellectual disability. The syndrome is highly variable. However, one of the most common findings in all patients are the lack of tears. Lack of tears with crying is often mentioned in hindsight after the diagnosis has been made. AAA syndrome may be diagnosed in early childhood or in adolescence. The disorder is typically managed by treating the symptoms with hormone replacement for adrenal insufficiency, lubricating drops for the eyes and managing low blood sugars.

== Cause ==
Triple-A syndrome is associated with mutations in the AAAS gene which encodes a protein known as ALADIN (ALacrima Achalasia adrenal Insufficiency Neurologic disorder). In 2000, Huebner et al. mapped the syndrome to a 6 cM interval on human chromosome 12q13 near the type II keratin gene cluster. Since inheritance and gene for the association is known, early diagnosis can allow genetic counseling. Furthermore, genotypic heterogeneity has also been documented suggesting that there may be other genes involved in this genetic disorder as well as unknown environmental factors that result in the phenotypic expression of the disease.

ALADIN protein is a component of the nuclear pore complex, situated toward its cytoplasmic side. Mutant ALADIN remains mis-localized in the cytoplasm and causes selective failure of nuclear protein import and hypersensitivity to oxidative stress. Mutant ALADIN also causes decreased nuclear import of aprataxin, a repair protein for DNA single-strand breaks, and DNA ligase I. These decreases in DNA repair proteins may allow accumulation of DNA damage that trigger cell death.Nucleoporin ALADIN participates in spindle assembly. ALADIN is employed in specific meiotic stages, including spindle assembly, and spindle positioning. Female mice homozygously null for ALADIN are sterile.

== Diagnosis ==
The diagnosis of this condition involves examination by a health provider. Clinical signs may lead to the diagnosis such as the lack of tears and digestive issues, such as acid reflux disease in infancy as well as symptoms of adrenal insufficiency such as frequent bouts of low blood sugars are highly suggestive of the disorder. Achalasia may be seen on plain X-rays and include an absence of fundal gas shadow, widened mediastinum and an air fluid level in mediastinum is also seen. The gold standard for confirming achalasia is a 24 hours manometry of oesophagus.This is a test that measures the pressure inside the esophagus. The test demonstrates non-relaxation of lower esophageal sphincter, increased tone of esophageal sphincter, atonic esophagus. Bird-beak sign and rat-tail sign can be appreciated on barium swallow. Lack of tears or alacrima is caused by the lack of production of lacrimal glands or ducts and defects in the nerves of the lacrimal gland caused by a dysfunction in the autonomic nervous system. The diagnosis is confirmed with genetic testing as well as clinical features.

== Treatment ==
There is no definitive cure for this syndrome because many of the mechanisms implicated have not yet been identified. The available treatments address only some of the symptoms. Lubricating drops and emulsions are used to remedy the absence of tear secretion. Achalasia can be treated with surgical intervention resulting in improved passage of food and drink into the stomach. Corticosteroids, such as hydrocortisone, are prescribed to solve the adrenal insufficiency. Early diagnosis may prevent morbidity and improve growth in children due to early treatment of adrenal insufficiency.

== See also ==
- Achalasia
- Addisonianism
- Alacrima
