= RAE1 =

Protein-coding gene in the species Homo sapiens

Identifiers
- Aliases: RAE1, MIG14, MRNP41, Mnrp41, dJ481F12.3, dJ800J21.1, ribonucleic acid export 1, Gle2
- External IDs: OMIM: 603343; MGI: 1913929; GeneCards: RAE1
Available structures
PDB	Ortholog search: PDBe RCSB
PDB	List of PDB id codes 3MMY, 4OWR

Gene location (Human)
Chr.	Chromosome 20 (human)
Band	20q13.31	Start	57,351,223 bp
Band	20q13.31	End	57,379,211 bp

Gene location (Mouse)
Chr.	Chromosome 2 (mouse)
Band	2 H3|2 95.66 cM	Start	172,841,910 bp
Band	2 H3|2 95.66 cM	End	172,857,532 bp
RNA expression pattern
Bgee	Human / Mouse (ortholog); Top expressed in: secondary oocyte; sperm; left testis; right testis; tendon of biceps brachii; internal globus pallidus; embryo; trabecular bone; ganglionic eminence; bone marrow / Top expressed in: otic placode; spermatocyte; saccule; otic vesicle; spermatid; epiblast; zygote; embryo; mandibular prominence; ventricular zone; More reference expression data
BioGPS	n/a
Gene ontology
Molecular function	microtubule binding; RNA binding; protein binding; ubiquitin binding
Cellular component	cytoplasm; nuclear pore; nucleus; nuclear envelope; fibrillar center; mitotic spindle pole; spindle pole; cytoskeleton; host cell
Biological process	cellular response to organic cyclic compound; viral process; regulation of mitotic spindle organization; transcription-dependent tethering of RNA polymerase II gene DNA at nuclear periphery; RNA export from nucleus; protein import into nucleus; cell cycle; cell division; mRNA export from nucleus; regulation of glycolytic process; tRNA export from nucleus; protein sumoylation; viral transcription; regulation of gene silencing by miRNA; intracellular transport of virus; regulation of cellular response to heat
Sources:Amigo / QuickGO
Orthologs
Databases	NCBI: entry; OMA: entry
Species	Human	Mouse
Entrez	8480	66679
Ensembl	ENSG00000101146	ENSMUSG00000027509
UniProt	P78406	Q8C570
RefSeq (mRNA)	NM_001015885; NM_003610	NM_175112
RefSeq (protein)	NP_001015885; NP_003601	NP_780321
Location (UCSC)	Chr 20: 57.35 – 57.38 Mb	Chr 2: 172.84 – 172.86 Mb
PubMed search
- Wikidata
View/Edit Human	View/Edit Mouse

mRNA export factor is a protein that in humans is encoded by the RAE1 gene.

Mutations in the Schizosaccharomyces pombe Rae1 and Saccharomyces cerevisiae Gle2 genes have been shown to result in accumulation of poly(A)-containing mRNA in the nucleus, suggesting that the encoded proteins are involved in RNA export. The protein encoded by this gene is a homolog of yeast Rae1. It contains four WD40 motifs, and has been shown to localize to distinct foci in the nucleoplasm, to the nuclear rim, and to meshwork-like structures throughout the cytoplasm. This gene is thought to be involved in nucleocytoplasmic transport, and in directly or indirectly attaching cytoplasmic mRNPs to the cytoskeleton. Alternatively spliced transcript variants encoding the same protein have been found for this gene.

== Interactions ==
RAE1 has been shown to interact with NUP98.
