= Jeremy Allgrove =

British paediatric endocrinologist

Jeremy Allgrove is a consultant paediatric endocrinologist specialising in paediatric diabetes at Barts and The London NHS Trust. He is the representative of The Royal College of Paediatrics and Child Health (RCPCH) on the Diabetes Dataset Advisory Group (for England). Allgrove studied medicine at Corpus Christi College, Cambridge, qualifying in 1973.

In 1978 Allgrove and colleagues discovered Triple A syndrome which is named Allgrove Syndrome after him.
