= NDC1 =

Protein-coding gene

Identifiers
- Aliases: NDC1, NET3, TMEM48, NDC1 transmembrane nucleoporin
- External IDs: OMIM: 610115; MGI: 1920037; GeneCards: NDC1

Gene location (Human)
Chr.	Chromosome 1 (human)
Band	1p32.3	Start	53,765,478 bp
Band	1p32.3	End	53,838,463 bp

Gene location (Mouse)
Chr.	Chromosome 4 (mouse)
Band	4|4 C7	Start	107,224,981 bp
Band	4|4 C7	End	107,273,543 bp
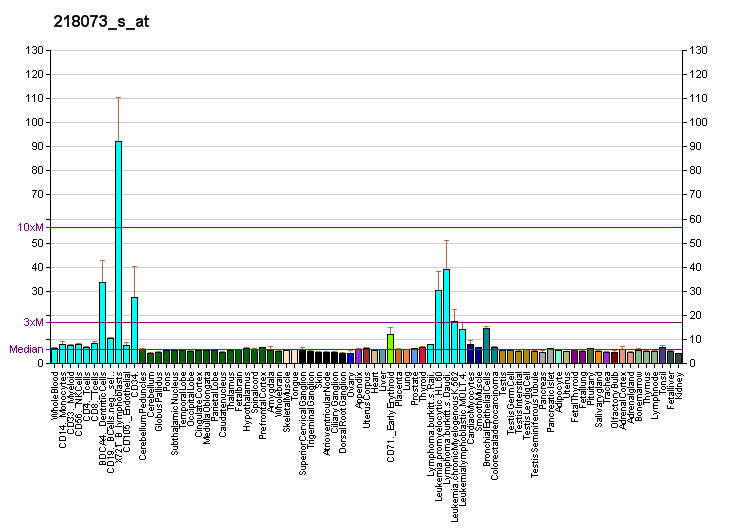
RNA expression pattern
Bgee	Human / Mouse (ortholog); Top expressed in: secondary oocyte; gonad; ventricular zone; tibia; gingival epithelium; epithelium of nasopharynx; mucosa of colon; mucosa of sigmoid colon; germinal epithelium; testicle / Top expressed in: tail of embryo; genital tubercle; primitive streak; cumulus cell; spermatocyte; epiblast; maxillary prominence; condyle; yolk sac; medullary collecting duct; More reference expression data
BioGPS	More reference expression data
Gene ontology
Molecular function	structural constituent of nuclear pore
Cellular component	cytoplasm; integral component of membrane; nuclear membrane; nuclear envelope; membrane; plasma membrane; nuclear pore; actin cytoskeleton; nucleus; spindle pole body; nuclear pore transmembrane ring; host cell
Biological process	mRNA transport; nuclear pore complex assembly; viral transcription; protein sumoylation; mitotic nuclear membrane disassembly; homologous chromosome pairing at meiosis; spermatogenesis; protein transport; regulation of cellular response to heat; viral process; mRNA export from nucleus; intracellular transport of virus; tRNA export from nucleus; spindle pole body duplication; regulation of gene silencing by miRNA; regulation of glycolytic process; transport; nuclear pore organization
Sources:Amigo / QuickGO
Orthologs
Databases	NCBI: entry; OMA: entry
Species	Human	Mouse
Entrez	55706	72787
Ensembl	ENSG00000058804	ENSMUSG00000028614
UniProt	Q9BTX1	Q8VCB1
RefSeq (mRNA)	NM_001168551; NM_018087	NM_028355
RefSeq (protein)	NP_001162023; NP_060557	NP_082631
Location (UCSC)	Chr 1: 53.77 – 53.84 Mb	Chr 4: 107.22 – 107.27 Mb
PubMed search
- Wikidata
View/Edit Human	View/Edit Mouse

Nucleoporin NDC1 is a protein that in humans is encoded by the TMEM48 gene. It anchors aladin to the nuclear pore complex.
