= RANBP1 =

Protein-coding gene in the species Homo sapiens

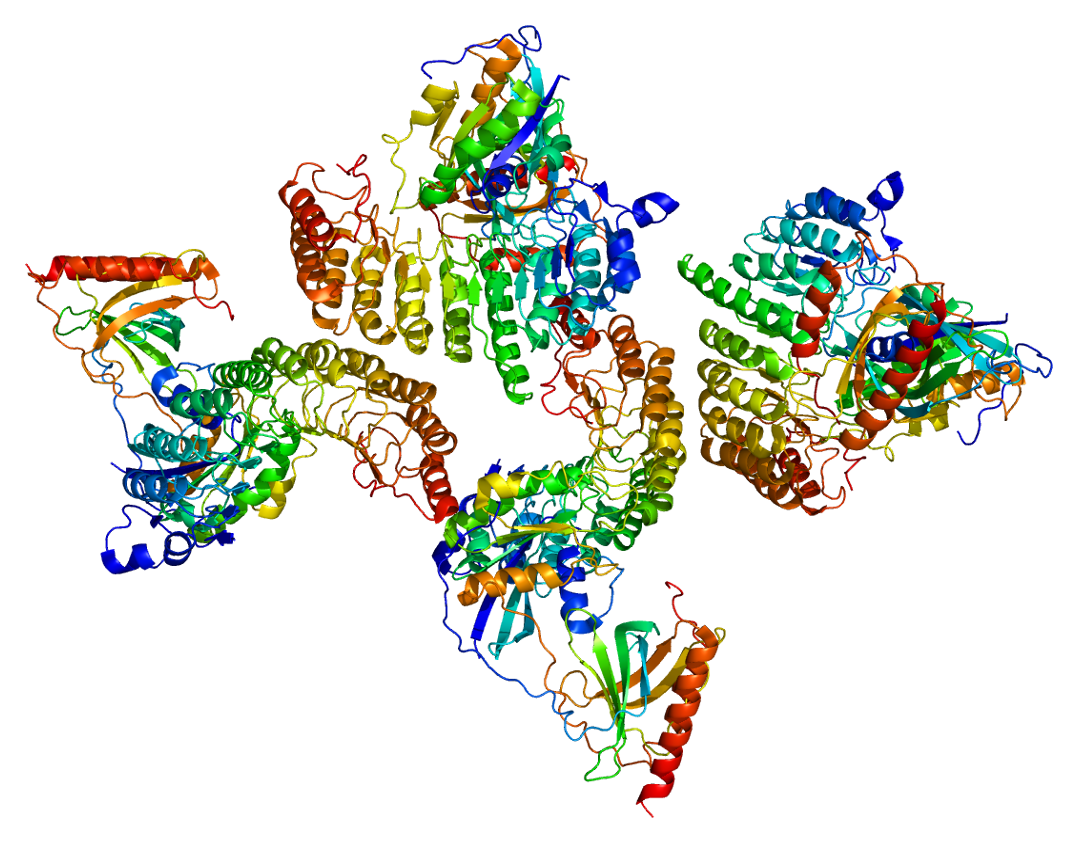
Available structures
PDB	Ortholog search: PDBe RCSB
PDB	List of PDB id codes 1K5D, 1K5G

Identifiers
- Aliases: RANBP1, HTF9A, RAN binding protein 1
- External IDs: OMIM: 601180; MGI: 96269; HomoloGene: 21600; GeneCards: RANBP1; OMA:RANBP1 - orthologs

Gene location (Human)
Chr.	Chromosome 22 (human)
Band	22q11.21	Start	20,115,938 bp
Band	22q11.21	End	20,127,355 bp

Gene location (Mouse)
Chr.	Chromosome 16 (mouse)
Band	16 A3|16 11.3 cM	Start	18,057,648 bp
Band	16 A3|16 11.3 cM	End	18,066,596 bp
RNA expression pattern
Bgee	Human / Mouse (ortholog); Top expressed in: ganglionic eminence; ventricular zone; left testis; right testis; mucosa of transverse colon; prefrontal cortex; cerebellar hemisphere; anterior cingulate cortex; right hemisphere of cerebellum; left uterine tube / Top expressed in: yolk sac; epiblast; embryo; tail of embryo; embryo; genital tubercle; ventricular zone; neural tube; mesencephalon; ganglionic eminence; More reference expression data
BioGPS	n/a
Gene ontology
Molecular function	GTPase activator activity; GDP-dissociation inhibitor activity; protein binding; cadherin binding
Cellular component	cytoplasm; nuclear envelope; nucleus; centrosome; cytosol; nuclear pore
Biological process	positive regulation of GTPase activity; intracellular transport; viral process; signal transduction; ubiquitin-dependent protein catabolic process; regulation of catalytic activity; protein import into nucleus; spindle organization; positive regulation of mitotic centrosome separation; RNA export from nucleus; G1/S transition of mitotic cell cycle
Sources:Amigo / QuickGO
Orthologs
Species	Human	Mouse
Entrez	5902	19385
Ensembl	ENSG00000099901	ENSMUSG00000005732
UniProt	P43487	P34022
RefSeq (mRNA)	NM_001278639; NM_001278640; NM_001278641; NM_002882	NM_011239
RefSeq (protein)	NP_001265568; NP_001265569; NP_001265570; NP_002873	NP_035369
Location (UCSC)	Chr 22: 20.12 – 20.13 Mb	Chr 16: 18.06 – 18.07 Mb
PubMed search
- Wikidata
View/Edit Human	View/Edit Mouse

Ran-specific binding protein 1 is an enzyme that in humans is encoded by the RANBP1 gene.

Ran/TC4-binding protein, RanBP1, interacts specifically with GTP-charged RAN. RANBP1 encodes a 23-kD protein that binds to RAN complexed with GTP but not GDP. RANBP1 does not activate GTPase activity of RAN but does markedly increase GTP hydrolysis by the RanGTPase-activating protein (RANGAP1). The RANBP1 cDNA encodes a 201-amino acid protein that is 92% similar to its mouse homolog. In both mammalian cells and in yeast, RANBP1 acts as a negative regulator of RCC1 by inhibiting RCC1-stimulated guanine nucleotide release from RAN.

== Interactions ==
RANBP1 has been shown to interact with XPO1, KPNB1 and Ran.
