= Nucleoporin 88 =

Protein-coding gene in the species Homo sapiens

NUP88

Identifiers
- Aliases: NUP88, nucleoporin 88, FADS4
- External IDs: OMIM: 602552; MGI: 104900; GeneCards: NUP88
Available structures
PDB	Ortholog search: PDBe RCSB
PDB	List of PDB id codes 7R5J, 7R5K, 7TDZ, 7VOP

Gene location (Human)
Chr.	Chromosome 17 (human)
Band	17p13.2	Start	5,360,963 bp
Band	17p13.2	End	5,419,676 bp

Gene location (Mouse)
Chr.	Chromosome 11 (mouse)
Band	11 B4|11 43.21 cM	Start	70,833,884 bp
Band	11 B4|11 43.21 cM	End	70,860,799 bp
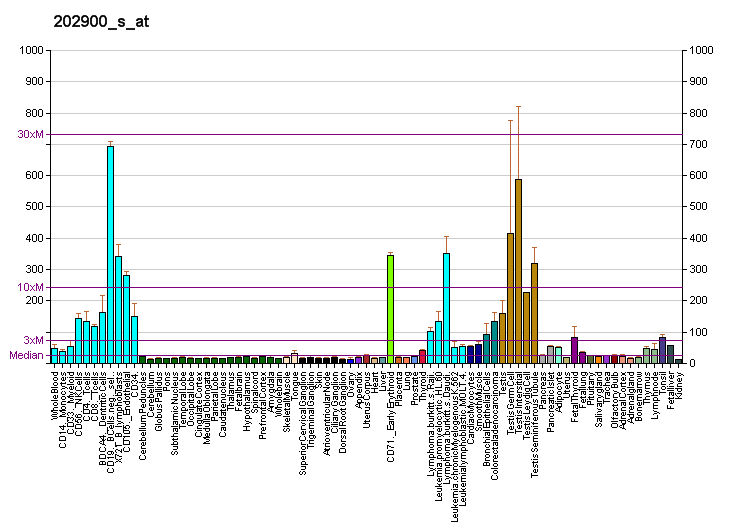
RNA expression pattern
Bgee	Human / Mouse (ortholog); Top expressed in: right testis; left testis; oocyte; gonad; right lobe of liver; secondary oocyte; sperm; mucosa of transverse colon; left lobe of thyroid gland; ventricular zone / Top expressed in: tail of embryo; zygote; genital tubercle; secondary oocyte; medial ganglionic eminence; spermatocyte; primary oocyte; abdominal wall; ventricular zone; epiblast; More reference expression data
BioGPS	More reference expression data
Gene ontology
Molecular function	transporter activity; structural constituent of nuclear pore
Cellular component	cytosol; nuclear pore; nucleoplasm; nucleus; host cell
Biological process	mRNA transport; protein import into nucleus; protein transport; viral process; mRNA export from nucleus; mitotic cell cycle; ribosomal large subunit export from nucleus; ribosomal small subunit export from nucleus; nucleocytoplasmic transport; protein export from nucleus; regulation of glycolytic process; tRNA export from nucleus; protein sumoylation; viral transcription; regulation of gene silencing by miRNA; intracellular transport of virus; regulation of cellular response to heat
Sources:Amigo / QuickGO
Orthologs
Databases	NCBI: entry; OMA: entry
Species	Human	Mouse
Entrez	4927	19069
Ensembl	ENSG00000108559	ENSMUSG00000040667
UniProt	Q99567	Q8CEC0
RefSeq (mRNA)	NM_002532; NM_001320653	NM_001083331; NM_001276406; NM_172394
RefSeq (protein)	NP_001307582; NP_002523	NP_001076800; NP_001263335; NP_765982
Location (UCSC)	Chr 17: 5.36 – 5.42 Mb	Chr 11: 70.83 – 70.86 Mb
PubMed search
- Wikidata
View/Edit Human	View/Edit Mouse

Nucleoporin 88 (Nup88) is a protein that in humans is encoded by the NUP88 gene.

== Function ==
The nuclear pore complex is a massive structure that extends across the nuclear envelope, forming a gateway that regulates the flow of macromolecules between the nucleus and the cytoplasm. Nucleoporins, a family of 50 to 100 proteins, are the main components of the nuclear pore complex in eukaryotic cells. The protein encoded by this gene belongs to the nucleoporin family and is associated with the oncogenic nucleoporin CAN/Nup214 in a dynamic subcomplex. This protein is also overexpressed in a large number of malignant neoplasms and precancerous dysplasias.

== Interactions ==
NUP88 has been shown to interact with NUP98.
