= NUP98 =

Protein-coding gene in the species Homo sapiens

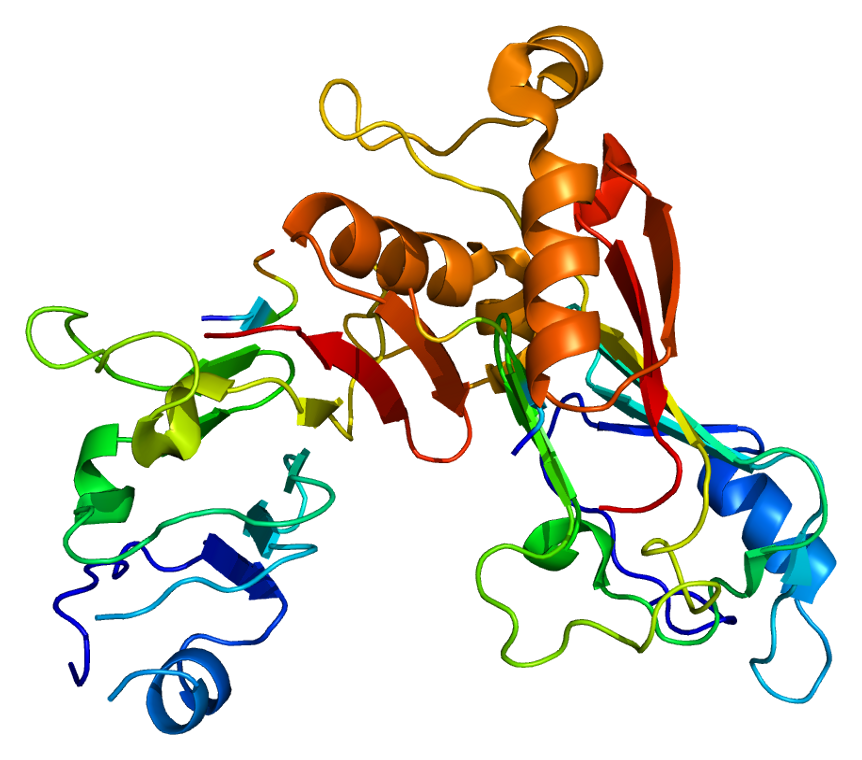

Identifiers
- Aliases: NUP98, ADIR2, NUP196, NUP96, nucleoporin 98kDa, nucleoporin 98
- External IDs: OMIM: 601021; MGI: 109404; GeneCards: NUP98
Available structures
PDB	Ortholog search: PDBe RCSB
PDB	List of PDB id codes 1KO6, 2Q5X, 2Q5Y, 3MMY, 4OWR, 5A9Q

Gene location (Human)
Chr.	Chromosome 11 (human)
Band	11p15.4	Start	3,671,083 bp
Band	11p15.4	End	3,797,792 bp

Gene location (Mouse)
Chr.	Chromosome 7 (mouse)
Band	7 E2|7 54.71 cM	Start	101,768,605 bp
Band	7 E2|7 54.71 cM	End	101,859,383 bp
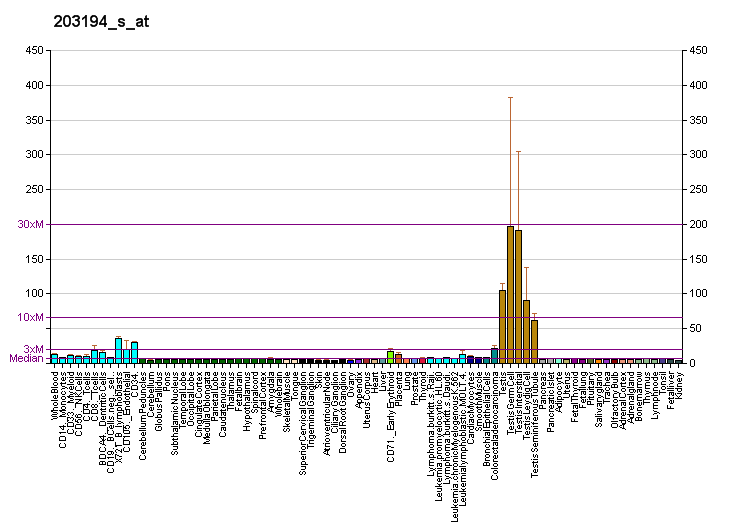

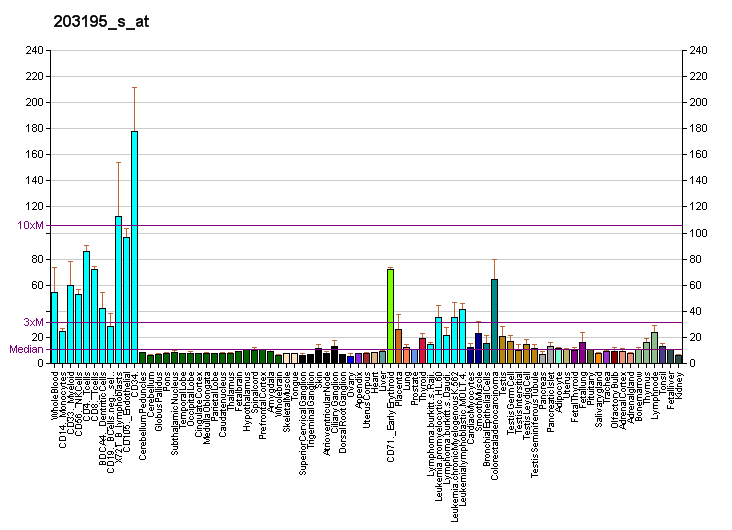
RNA expression pattern
Bgee	Human / Mouse (ortholog); Top expressed in: left testis; right testis; epithelium of colon; secondary oocyte; ventricular zone; muscle of thigh; left ovary; Achilles tendon; left uterine tube; upper lobe of left lung / Top expressed in: secondary oocyte; zygote; spermatid; primary oocyte; vestibular membrane of cochlear duct; tail of embryo; internal carotid artery; external carotid artery; spermatocyte; genital tubercle; More reference expression data
BioGPS	More reference expression data
Gene ontology
Molecular function	transporter activity; peptide binding; protein binding; nuclear localization sequence binding; RNA binding; peptidase activity; serine-type peptidase activity; hydrolase activity; transcription coactivator activity; mRNA binding; promoter-specific chromatin binding; structural constituent of nuclear pore
Cellular component	cytosol; nuclear membrane; nuclear envelope; nuclear periphery; membrane; nuclear pore; nuclear pore outer ring; nuclear inclusion body; nuclear pore nuclear basket; nucleus; kinetochore; nuclear pore cytoplasmic filaments; nucleoplasm; intracellular membrane-bounded organelle; nuclear body; ribonucleoprotein complex; host cell
Biological process	mRNA transport; nuclear pore complex assembly; DNA replication; protein transport; viral process; nuclear pore organization; posttranscriptional tethering of RNA polymerase II gene DNA at nuclear periphery; RNA export from nucleus; telomere tethering at nuclear periphery; mRNA export from nucleus; protein import into nucleus; proteolysis; positive regulation of transcription by RNA polymerase II; positive regulation of mRNA splicing, via spliceosome; transcription by RNA polymerase II; nucleocytoplasmic transport; positive regulation of nucleic acid-templated transcription; regulation of glycolytic process; tRNA export from nucleus; protein sumoylation; viral transcription; regulation of gene silencing by miRNA; intracellular transport of virus; regulation of cellular response to heat
Sources:Amigo / QuickGO
Orthologs
Databases	NCBI: entry; OMA: entry
Species	Human	Mouse
Entrez	4928	269966
Ensembl	ENSG00000110713	ENSMUSG00000063550
UniProt	P52948	Q6PFD9
RefSeq (mRNA)	NM_005387; NM_016320; NM_139131; NM_139132	NM_001287164; NM_001287165; NM_001287166; NM_001287167; NM_022979
RefSeq (protein)	NP_005378; NP_057404; NP_624357; NP_624358; NP_001352054 NP_001352055; NP_001352056; NP_001352057; NP_001352058	NP_001274093; NP_001274094; NP_001274095; NP_001274096; NP_075355 NP_001391063; NP_001391064; NP_001391065; NP_001391066; NP_001391067; NP_001391068; NP_001391069; NP_001391070
Location (UCSC)	Chr 11: 3.67 – 3.8 Mb	Chr 7: 101.77 – 101.86 Mb
PubMed search
- Wikidata
View/Edit Human	View/Edit Mouse

Nuclear pore complex protein Nup98-Nup96 is a protein that in humans is encoded by the NUP98 gene.

== Function ==
Signal-mediated nuclear import and export proceed through the nuclear pore complex (NPC), which is composed of approximately 30 unique proteins collectively known as nucleoporins. The 98 kD nucleoporin is generated through a biogenesis pathway that involves synthesis and proteolytic cleavage of a 186 kD precursor protein. This cleavage results in the 98 kD nucleoporin as well as a 96 kD nucleoporin, both of which are localized to the nucleoplasmic side of the NPC. Rat studies show that the 98 kD nucleoporin functions as one of several docking site nucleoporins of transport substrates. The human gene has been shown to fuse to several genes following chromosome translocations in acute myelogenous leukemia (AML) and T-cell acute lymphocytic leukemia (T-ALL). This gene is one of several genes located in the imprinted gene domain of 11p15.5, an important tumor-suppressor gene region. Alterations in this region have been associated with the Beckwith-Wiedemann syndrome, Wilms tumor, rhabdomyosarcoma, adrenocortical carcinoma, and lung, ovarian, and breast cancer. Alternative splicing of this gene results in several transcript variants; however, not all variants have been fully described.

== Interactions ==
NUP98 has been shown to interact with:

- CREB-binding protein,
- KPNB1,
- NUP88,
- RAE1, and
- TNPO2.
