= Nucleoporin 37 =

NUP37

Identifiers
- Aliases: NUP37, p37, nucleoporin 37kDa, nucleoporin 37, MCPH24
- External IDs: OMIM: 609264; MGI: 1919964; GeneCards: NUP37
Available structures
| PDB | Ortholog search: PDBe RCSB |
| PDB | List of PDB id codes 5A9Q |

Gene location (Mouse)
| Chr. | Chromosome 10 (mouse) |
| Band | 10|10 C1 | Start | 87,982,854 bp |
| Band | 10|10 C1 | End | 88,014,252 bp |
RNA expression pattern
| Bgee | Human / Mouse (ortholog); Top expressed in: oocyte; secondary oocyte; rectum; bronchial epithelial cell; islet of Langerhans; germinal epithelium; oral cavity; bone marrow; monocyte; appendix / Top expressed in: primitive streak; endothelial cell of lymphatic vessel; primary oocyte; condyle; epiblast; somite; zygote; secondary oocyte; embryo; morula; More reference expression data |
| BioGPS | n/a |
Gene ontology
| Molecular function | protein binding |
| Cellular component | cytosol; nuclear envelope; nuclear pore; nucleoplasm; chromosome; nuclear pore outer ring; chromosome, centromeric region; nucleus; kinetochore; host cell |
| Biological process | mRNA transport; viral transcription; chromosome segregation; protein sumoylation; cell division; mitotic nuclear membrane disassembly; regulation of cellular response to heat; protein transport; cell cycle; viral process; intracellular transport of virus; mRNA export from nucleus; tRNA export from nucleus; sister chromatid cohesion; regulation of gene silencing by miRNA; regulation of glycolytic process; transport |
Sources:Amigo / QuickGO
Orthologs
| Databases | NCBI: entry |
| Species | Human | Mouse |
| Entrez | 79023 | 69736 |
| Ensembl | n/a | ENSMUSG00000035351 |
| UniProt | Q8NFH4 | Q9CWU9 |
| RefSeq (mRNA) | NM_024057 | NM_027191; NM_028334 |
| RefSeq (protein) | NP_076962 | NP_081467; NP_082610 |
| Location (UCSC) | n/a | Chr 10: 87.98 – 88.01 Mb |
| PubMed search |
- Wikidata
| View/Edit Human | View/Edit Mouse |

Nucleoporin 37 (Nup37) is a protein that in humans is encoded by the NUP37 gene.

== Function ==
Transport of macromolecules between the cytoplasm and nucleus occurs through nuclear pore complexes (NPCs) embedded in the nuclear envelope. NPCs are composed of subcomplexes, and NUP37 is part of one such subcomplex, Nup107-160.
