= Nucleoporin 188 =

Protein-coding gene in the species Homo sapiens

NUP188

Identifiers
- Aliases: NUP188, KIAA0169, hNup188, nucleoporin 188kDa, nucleoporin 188, SANDSTEF
- External IDs: OMIM: 615587; MGI: 2446190; GeneCards: NUP188
Available structures
PDB	Ortholog search: PDBe RCSB
PDB	List of PDB id codes 5IJO

Gene location (Human)
Chr.	Chromosome 9 (human)
Band	9q34.11	Start	128,947,699 bp
Band	9q34.11	End	129,007,096 bp

Gene location (Mouse)
Chr.	Chromosome 2 (mouse)
Band	2|2 B	Start	30,176,409 bp
Band	2|2 B	End	30,234,278 bp
RNA expression pattern
Bgee	Human / Mouse (ortholog); Top expressed in: right testis; left testis; cerebellar hemisphere; right hemisphere of cerebellum; anterior pituitary; testicle; stromal cell of endometrium; skin of leg; gastric mucosa; ectocervix / Top expressed in: spermatocyte; spermatid; seminiferous tubule; epiblast; tail of embryo; ventricular zone; Gonadal ridge; zygote; maxillary prominence; mandibular prominence; More reference expression data
BioGPS	n/a
Gene ontology
Molecular function	structural constituent of nuclear pore
Cellular component	nuclear pore; nucleus; nuclear pore inner ring; nuclear envelope; membrane; host cell
Biological process	mitotic nuclear membrane disassembly; viral transcription; protein import into nucleus; viral process; RNA export from nucleus; protein sumoylation; protein transport; mRNA transport; regulation of cellular response to heat; intracellular transport of virus; glomerular visceral epithelial cell migration; mRNA export from nucleus; tRNA export from nucleus; regulation of gene silencing by miRNA; regulation of glycolytic process; transport
Sources:Amigo / QuickGO
Orthologs
Databases	NCBI: entry; OMA: entry
Species	Human	Mouse
Entrez	23511	227699
Ensembl	ENSG00000095319	ENSMUSG00000052533
UniProt	Q5SRE5	Q6ZQH8
RefSeq (mRNA)	NM_015354	NM_198304
RefSeq (protein)	NP_056169	NP_938046
Location (UCSC)	Chr 9: 128.95 – 129.01 Mb	Chr 2: 30.18 – 30.23 Mb
PubMed search
- Wikidata
View/Edit Human	View/Edit Mouse

Nucleoporin 188 (Nup188) is a protein that in humans is encoded by the NUP188 gene.

== Function ==
Transport of macromolecules between the cytoplasm and nucleus occurs through nuclear pore complexes (NPCs) embedded in the nuclear envelope. NPCs are composed of subcomplexes, and NUP188 is part of one such subcomplex.
