= Nucleoporin 85 =

Protein-coding gene in the species Homo sapiens

NUP85

Identifiers
- Aliases: NUP85, Nup75, FROUNT, nucleoporin 85, NPHS17
- External IDs: OMIM: 170285; MGI: 3046173; GeneCards: NUP85
Available structures
PDB	Ortholog search: PDBe RCSB
PDB	List of PDB id codes 5A9Q

Gene location (Human)
Chr.	Chromosome 17 (human)
Band	17q25.1	Start	75,205,659 bp
Band	17q25.1	End	75,235,758 bp

Gene location (Mouse)
Chr.	Chromosome 11 (mouse)
Band	11|11 E2	Start	115,455,260 bp
Band	11|11 E2	End	115,474,811 bp
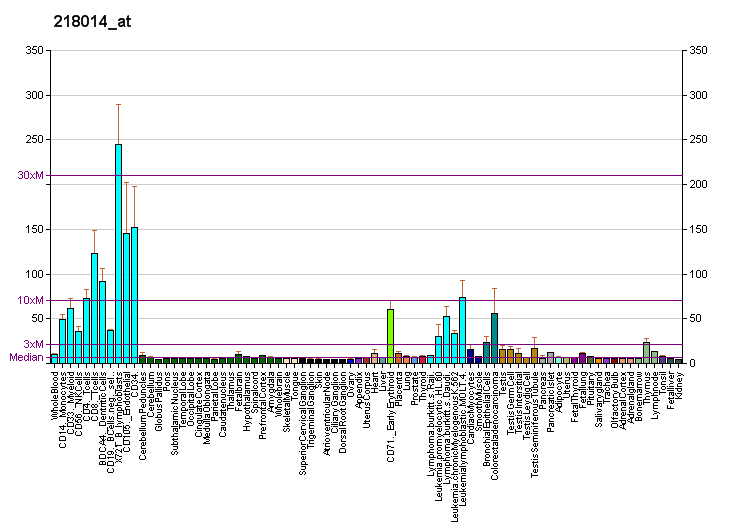
RNA expression pattern
Bgee	Human / Mouse (ortholog); Top expressed in: cerebellar hemisphere; right hemisphere of cerebellum; right testis; gonad; tibial nerve; left testis; mucosa of transverse colon; right ovary; right uterine tube; oocyte / Top expressed in: fossa; condyle; primitive streak; zygote; primary oocyte; ventricular zone; epiblast; Paneth cell; secondary oocyte; Rostral migratory stream; More reference expression data
BioGPS	More reference expression data
Gene ontology
Molecular function	structural constituent of nuclear pore; protein binding
Cellular component	cytoplasm; nuclear membrane; membrane; nuclear envelope; spindle; nuclear pore; chromosome; nuclear pore outer ring; chromosome, centromeric region; cytoskeleton; kinetochore; nucleus; cytosol; host cell
Biological process	mRNA transport; protein import into nucleus; viral transcription; protein sumoylation; positive regulation of transcription, DNA-templated; chemotaxis; mitotic nuclear membrane disassembly; macrophage chemotaxis; regulation of cellular response to heat; protein transport; viral process; lamellipodium assembly; intracellular transport of virus; mRNA export from nucleus; tRNA export from nucleus; sister chromatid cohesion; regulation of gene silencing by miRNA; regulation of glycolytic process; transport; nephron development; nucleocytoplasmic transport
Sources:Amigo / QuickGO
Orthologs
Databases	NCBI: entry; OMA: entry
Species	Human	Mouse
Entrez	79902	445007
Ensembl	ENSG00000125450	ENSMUSG00000020739
UniProt	Q9BW27	Q8R480
RefSeq (mRNA)	NM_001303276; NM_024844; NM_001330472	NM_001002929
RefSeq (protein)	NP_001290205; NP_001317401; NP_079120	NP_001002929
Location (UCSC)	Chr 17: 75.21 – 75.24 Mb	Chr 11: 115.46 – 115.47 Mb
PubMed search
- Wikidata
View/Edit Human	View/Edit Mouse

Nucleoporin 85 (Nup85) is a protein that in humans is encoded by the NUP85 gene.

== Function ==
Bidirectional transport of macromolecules between the cytoplasm and nucleus occurs through nuclear pore complexes (NPCs) embedded in the nuclear envelope. NPCs are composed of subcomplexes, and NUP85 is part of one such subcomplex, Nup107-160.
