= Nucleoporin 54 =

Protein-coding gene in the species Homo sapiens

NUP54

Identifiers
- Aliases: NUP54, nucleoporin 54
- External IDs: OMIM: 607607; MGI: 1920460; GeneCards: NUP54
Available structures
PDB	Ortholog search: PDBe RCSB
PDB	List of PDB id codes 4JNU, 4JNV, 4JO7, 4JO9, 5IJO, 5IJN

Gene location (Human)
Chr.	Chromosome 4 (human)
Band	4q21.1	Start	76,107,562 bp
Band	4q21.1	End	76,148,485 bp

Gene location (Mouse)
Chr.	Chromosome 5 (mouse)
Band	5|5 E2	Start	92,563,399 bp
Band	5|5 E2	End	92,583,078 bp
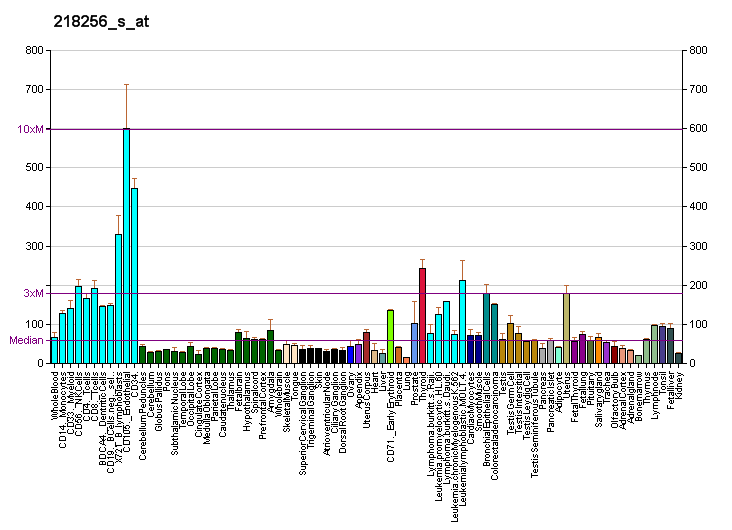
RNA expression pattern
Bgee	Human / Mouse (ortholog); Top expressed in: Achilles tendon; oocyte; mucosa of paranasal sinus; secondary oocyte; skin of hip; ventricular zone; germinal epithelium; mucosa of sigmoid colon; right uterine tube; cerebellar hemisphere / Top expressed in: epiblast; primitive streak; zygote; tail of embryo; Paneth cell; secondary oocyte; genital tubercle; primary oocyte; embryo; ventricular zone; More reference expression data
BioGPS	More reference expression data
Gene ontology
Molecular function	protein binding; structural constituent of nuclear pore
Cellular component	nuclear membrane; nuclear envelope; membrane; nuclear pore; nuclear pore central transport channel; nucleus; protein-containing complex; host cell
Biological process	protein targeting; mRNA transport; protein heterotetramerization; protein localization to nuclear inner membrane; protein heterooligomerization; nucleocytoplasmic transport; regulation of protein import into nucleus; protein transport; viral process; protein homooligomerization; nuclear pore organization; NLS-bearing protein import into nucleus; mRNA export from nucleus; protein heterotrimerization; regulation of glycolytic process; tRNA export from nucleus; protein sumoylation; viral transcription; regulation of gene silencing by miRNA; intracellular transport of virus; regulation of cellular response to heat
Sources:Amigo / QuickGO
Orthologs
Databases	NCBI: entry; OMA: entry
Species	Human	Mouse
Entrez	53371	269113
Ensembl	ENSG00000138750	ENSMUSG00000034826
UniProt	Q7Z3B4	Q8BTS4
RefSeq (mRNA)	NM_001278603; NM_017426	NM_183392; NM_001359995
RefSeq (protein)	NP_001265532; NP_059122	NP_899248; NP_001346924
Location (UCSC)	Chr 4: 76.11 – 76.15 Mb	Chr 5: 92.56 – 92.58 Mb
PubMed search
- Wikidata
View/Edit Human	View/Edit Mouse

Nucleoporin 54 (Nup54) is a protein that in humans is encoded by the NUP54 gene.

== Function ==
The nuclear envelope creates distinct nuclear and cytoplasmic compartments in eukaryotic cells. It consists of two concentric membranes perforated by nuclear pores, large protein complexes that form aqueous channels to regulate the flow of macromolecules between the nucleus and the cytoplasm. These complexes are composed of at least 100 different polypeptide subunits, many of which belong to the nucleoporin family. This gene encodes a member of the phe-gly (FG) repeat-containing nucleoporin subset.
