= Nucleoporin 160 =

Protein-coding gene in the species Homo sapiens

NUP160

Identifiers
- Aliases: NUP160, nucleoporin 160, Nup160, 160kDa, 2810011M03Rik, AA414952, AU020188, Gtl-13, Gtl1-13, Gtl13, mKIAA0197, NPHS19
- External IDs: OMIM: 607614; MGI: 1926227; GeneCards: NUP160
Available structures
PDB	Ortholog search: PDBe RCSB
PDB	List of PDB id codes 5A9Q

Gene location (Human)
Chr.	Chromosome 11 (human)
Band	11p11.2	Start	47,778,087 bp
Band	11p11.2	End	47,848,555 bp

Gene location (Mouse)
Chr.	Chromosome 2 (mouse)
Band	2|2 E1	Start	90,507,559 bp
Band	2|2 E1	End	90,566,672 bp
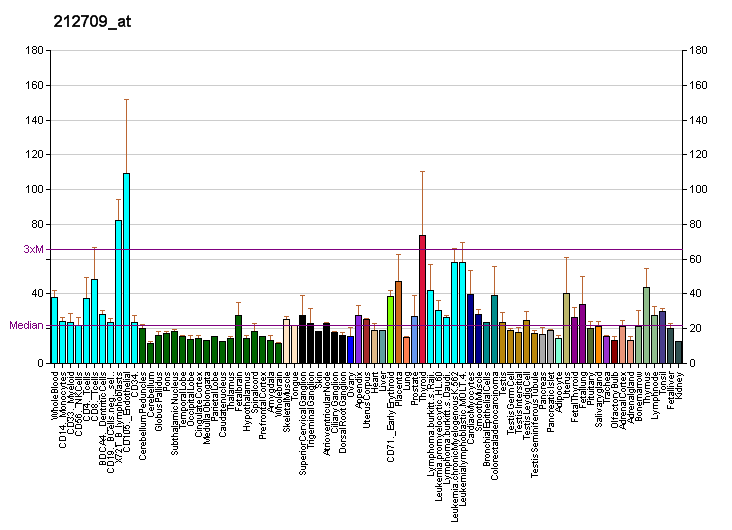
RNA expression pattern
Bgee	Human / Mouse (ortholog); Top expressed in: oocyte; mucosa of paranasal sinus; secondary oocyte; ganglionic eminence; ventricular zone; germinal epithelium; left ovary; right ovary; endometrium; epithelium of colon / Top expressed in: spermatid; epiblast; tail of embryo; zygote; secondary oocyte; mandibular prominence; maxillary prominence; genital tubercle; primary oocyte; abdominal wall; More reference expression data
BioGPS	More reference expression data
Gene ontology
Molecular function	protein binding; structural constituent of nuclear pore
Cellular component	cytosol; nuclear envelope; nuclear pore; nuclear pore outer ring; nucleus; kinetochore; host cell
Biological process	mRNA transport; protein transport; viral process; mRNA export from nucleus; regulation of glycolytic process; tRNA export from nucleus; protein sumoylation; viral transcription; regulation of gene silencing by miRNA; nephron development; intracellular transport of virus; regulation of cellular response to heat
Sources:Amigo / QuickGO
Orthologs
Databases	NCBI: entry; OMA: entry
Species	Human	Mouse
Entrez	23279	59015
Ensembl	ENSG00000030066	ENSMUSG00000051329
UniProt	Q12769	Q9Z0W3
RefSeq (mRNA)	NM_015231; NM_001318399	NM_021512
RefSeq (protein)	NP_001305328; NP_056046	NP_067487
Location (UCSC)	Chr 11: 47.78 – 47.85 Mb	Chr 2: 90.51 – 90.57 Mb
PubMed search
- Wikidata
View/Edit Human	View/Edit Mouse

Nucleoporin 160 (Nup160) is a protein that in humans is encoded by the NUP160 gene.

NUP160 is 1 of up to 60 proteins that make up the 120-MD nuclear pore complex, which mediates nucleoplasmic transport.[supplied by OMIM]
