= Nucleoporin 205 =

Protein-coding gene in the species Homo sapiens

NUP205

Identifiers
- Aliases: NUP205, C7orf14, NPHS13, nucleoporin 205kDa, nucleoporin 205
- External IDs: OMIM: 614352; MGI: 2141625; GeneCards: NUP205
Available structures
| PDB | Human UniProt search: PDBe RCSB |
| PDB | List of PDB id codes 5IJN, 5IJO |

Gene location (Human)
| Chr. | Chromosome 7 (human) |
| Band | 7q33 | Start | 135,557,917 bp |
| Band | 7q33 | End | 135,648,757 bp |

Gene location (Mouse)
| Chr. | Chromosome 6 (mouse) |
| Band | 6|6 B1 | Start | 35,154,356 bp |
| Band | 6|6 B1 | End | 35,224,531 bp |
RNA expression pattern
| Bgee | Human / Mouse (ortholog); Top expressed in: ventricular zone; ganglionic eminence; secondary oocyte; anterior pituitary; gonad; skin of abdomen; ectocervix; skin of leg; mucosa of transverse colon; left uterine tube / Top expressed in: spermatocyte; hand; primitive streak; spermatid; seminiferous tubule; maxillary prominence; abdominal wall; mandibular prominence; epiblast; endothelial cell of lymphatic vessel; More reference expression data |
| BioGPS | n/a |
Gene ontology
| Molecular function | structural constituent of nuclear pore; protein binding |
| Cellular component | nuclear membrane; nuclear envelope; membrane; nuclear periphery; nuclear pore inner ring; nuclear pore; nucleus; host cell |
| Biological process | mRNA transport; nuclear pore complex assembly; viral transcription; protein sumoylation; mitotic nuclear membrane disassembly; nucleocytoplasmic transport; regulation of cellular response to heat; protein transport; viral process; intracellular transport of virus; tRNA export from nucleus; mRNA export from nucleus; regulation of gene silencing by miRNA; regulation of glycolytic process; transport; nuclear pore organization |
Sources:Amigo / QuickGO
Orthologs
| Databases | NCBI: entry; OMA: entry |
| Species | Human | Mouse |
| Entrez | 23165 | 70699 |
| Ensembl | ENSG00000155561 | ENSMUSG00000038759 |
| UniProt | Q92621 | n/a |
| RefSeq (mRNA) | NM_015135; NM_001329434 | NM_027513 |
| RefSeq (protein) | NP_001316363; NP_055950 | n/a |
| Location (UCSC) | Chr 7: 135.56 – 135.65 Mb | Chr 6: 35.15 – 35.22 Mb |
| PubMed search |
- Wikidata
| View/Edit Human | View/Edit Mouse |

Nucleoporin 205 (Nup205) is a protein that in humans is encoded by the NUP205 gene.

== Function ==
Transport of macromolecules between the cytoplasm and nucleus occurs through nuclear pore complexes (NPCs) embedded in the nuclear envelope. NPC's are composed of subcomplexes, and NUP205 is part of one such subcomplex. It has also been recently shown that Nup205 is required for proper viral gene expression.
