= Nucleoporin 153 =

Protein-coding gene in the species Homo sapiens

NUP153
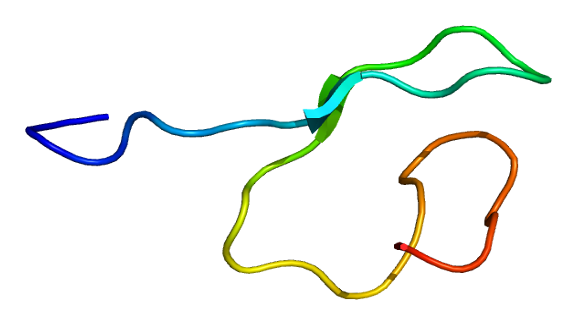

Identifiers
- Aliases: NUP153, HN153, nucleoporin 153kDa, nucleoporin 153
- External IDs: OMIM: 603948; MGI: 2385621; GeneCards: NUP153
Available structures
PDB	Human UniProt search: PDBe RCSB
PDB	List of PDB id codes 2EBQ, 2EBR, 2EBV, 2GQE, 4U0C, 4U0D

Gene location (Human)
Chr.	Chromosome 6 (human)
Band	6p22.3	Start	17,615,035 bp
Band	6p22.3	End	17,706,925 bp

Gene location (Mouse)
Chr.	Chromosome 13 (mouse)
Band	13|13 A5	Start	46,833,381 bp
Band	13|13 A5	End	46,881,416 bp
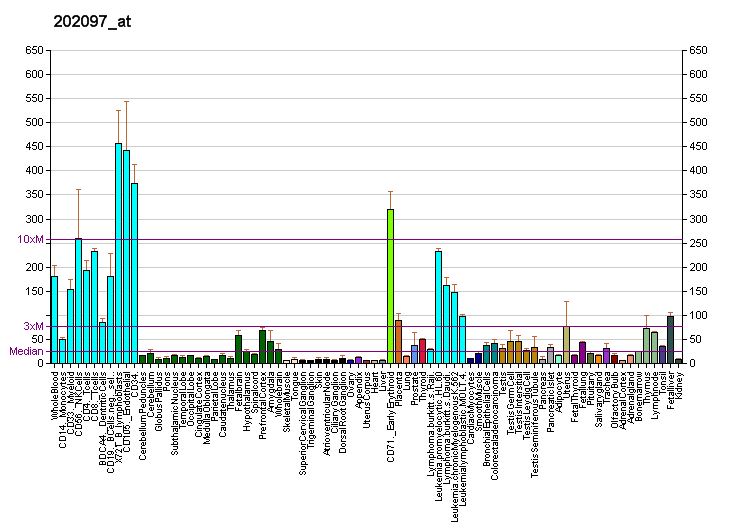
RNA expression pattern
Bgee	Human / Mouse (ortholog); Top expressed in: secondary oocyte; epithelium of nasopharynx; cartilage tissue; tibia; germinal epithelium; Epithelium of choroid plexus; amniotic fluid; skin of thigh; parietal pleura; Skeletal muscle tissue of rectus abdominis / Top expressed in: tail of embryo; primitive streak; genital tubercle; Gonadal ridge; ciliary body; Paneth cell; abdominal wall; medial ganglionic eminence; mandibular prominence; spermatid; More reference expression data
BioGPS	More reference expression data
Gene ontology
Molecular function	DNA binding; protein-membrane adaptor activity; metal ion binding; protein binding; identical protein binding; nuclear localization sequence binding; structural constituent of nuclear pore
Cellular component	nuclear membrane; nuclear periphery; membrane; nuclear pore; nucleoplasm; nucleolus; nuclear inclusion body; nuclear pore nuclear basket; nucleus; nuclear pore central transport channel; cytosol; host cell
Biological process	mRNA transport; nuclear pore complex assembly; viral penetration into host nucleus; protein transport; viral entry into host cell; viral process; negative regulation of RNA export from nucleus; mRNA export from nucleus; protein import into nucleus; regulation of glycolytic process; tRNA export from nucleus; protein sumoylation; viral transcription; regulation of gene silencing by miRNA; intracellular transport of virus; regulation of cellular response to heat
Sources:Amigo / QuickGO
Orthologs
Databases	NCBI: entry; OMA: entry
Species	Human	Mouse
Entrez	9972	218210
Ensembl	ENSG00000124789	ENSMUSG00000021374
UniProt	P49790	n/a
RefSeq (mRNA)	NM_001278209; NM_001278210; NM_005124	NM_175749
RefSeq (protein)	NP_001265138; NP_001265139; NP_005115	n/a
Location (UCSC)	Chr 6: 17.62 – 17.71 Mb	Chr 13: 46.83 – 46.88 Mb
PubMed search
- Wikidata
View/Edit Human	View/Edit Mouse

Nucleoporin 153 (Nup153) is a protein which in humans is encoded by the NUP153 gene. It is an essential component of the basket of nuclear pore complexes (NPCs) in vertebrates, and is required for the anchoring of NPCs. It also acts as the docking site of an importing karyopherin. On the cytoplasmic side of the NPC, Nup358 fulfills an analogous role.

== Background ==
Nuclear pore complexes are extremely elaborate structures that mediate the regulated movement of macromolecules between the nucleus and cytoplasm. These complexes are composed of at least 100 different polypeptide subunits, many of which belong to the nucleoporin family. Nucleoporins are pore complex-specific glycoproteins characterized by cytoplasmically oriented O-linked N-acetylglucosamine residues and numerous repeats of the pentapeptide sequence XFXFG.

== Structure ==
Nucleoporin 153 has a mass of 153 kDA (hence its name). It is filamentous, and it contains three distinct domains: an N-terminal region within which a pore targeting domain has been identified, a central region containing multiple zinc finger motifs, and a C-terminal region containing multiple XFXFG repeats.

== Interactions ==
NUP153 has been shown to interact with SENP2 and KPNB1.
