= Alpha solenoid =

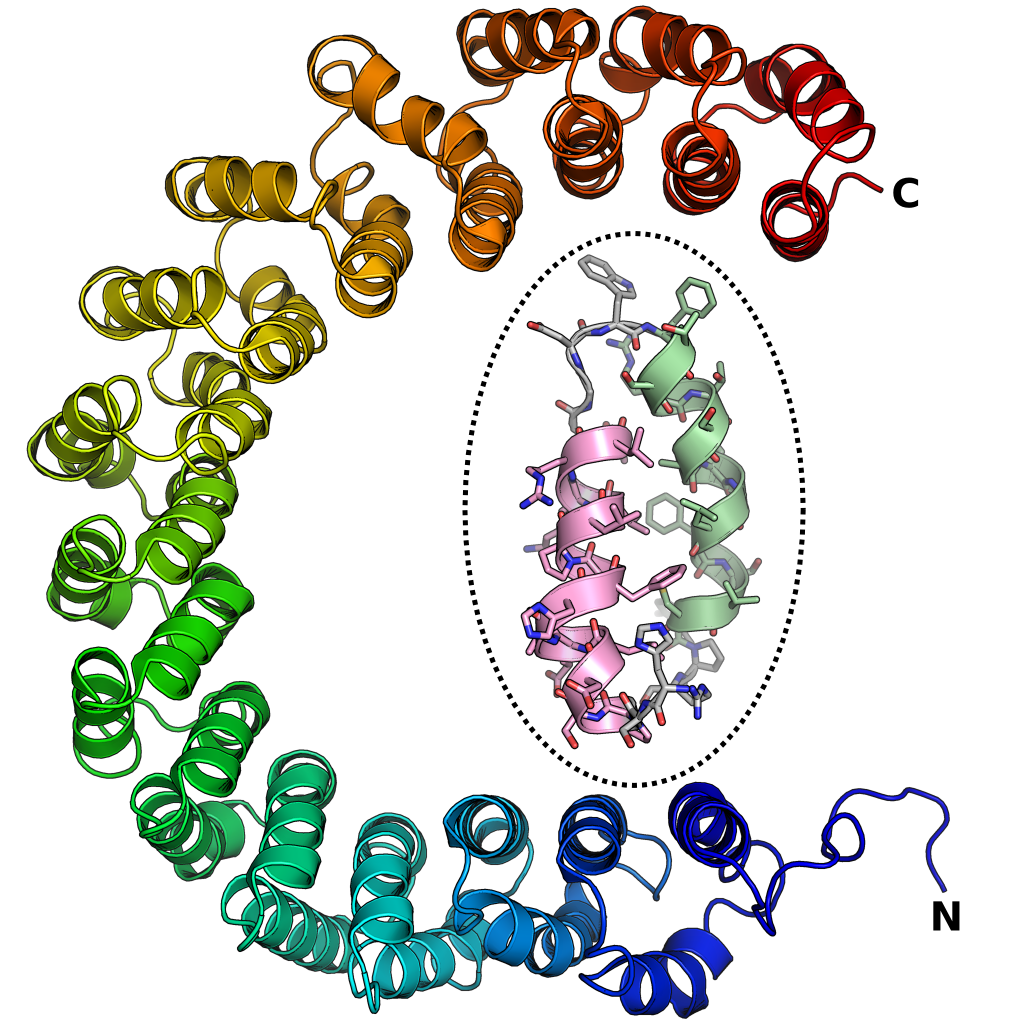
An example of an alpha solenoid structure composed of 15 HEAT repeats. The protein phosphatase 2A regulatory subunit is shown with the N-terminus in blue at bottom and the C-terminus in red at top. A single helix-turn-helix motif is shown in the center with the outer helix in pink, the inner helix in green, and the turn in white. From PDB: 2IAE.

An alpha solenoid (sometimes also known as an alpha horseshoe or as stacked pairs of alpha helices, abbreviated SPAH) is a protein fold composed of repeating alpha helix subunits, commonly helix-turn-helix motifs, arranged in antiparallel fashion to form a superhelix. Alpha solenoids are known for their flexibility and plasticity. Like beta propellers, alpha solenoids are a form of solenoid protein domain commonly found in the proteins comprising the nuclear pore complex. They are also common in membrane coat proteins known as coatomers, such as clathrin, and in regulatory proteins that form extensive protein-protein interactions with their binding partners. Examples of alpha solenoid structures binding RNA and lipids have also been described.

== Terminology and classification ==
The term "alpha solenoid" has been used somewhat inconsistently in the literature. As originally defined, alpha solenoids were composed of helix-turn-helix motifs that stacked into an open superhelix. However, protein structural classification systems have used varying terminology; the Structural Classification of Proteins (SCOP) database describes these proteins using the term "alpha alpha superhelix". The CATH database uses the term "alpha horseshoe" for these proteins, and uses "alpha solenoid" for a somewhat different and more compact structure exemplified by the peridinin-chlorophyll binding protein.

== Structure ==
Alpha solenoid proteins are composed of repeating structural units containing at least two alpha helices arranged in an antiparallel orientation. Often the repeating unit is a helix-turn-helix motif, but it can be more elaborate, as in variants with an additional helix in the turn segment. Alpha solenoids can be formed by several different types of helical tandem repeats, including HEAT repeats, Armadillo repeats, tetratricopeptide (TPR) repeats, leucine-rich repeats, and ankyrin repeats.

Alpha solenoids have unusual elasticity and flexibility relative to globular proteins. They are sometimes considered to occupy an intermediate position between globular proteins and fibrous structural proteins, distinct from the latter in part due to the alpha solenoids' lack of need for intermolecular interactions to maintain their structure. The extent of the curvature of an alpha solenoid superhelix varies considerably among the class, resulting in the ability of these proteins to form large, extended protein-protein interaction surfaces or to form deep concave areas for binding globular proteins.

Because they are composed of repeating relatively short subunits, alpha solenoids can acquire additional subunits relatively easily, resulting in new interaction surface properties. As a result, known alpha solenoid proteins vary substantially in length.

== Function ==
=== Nuclear pore complex components ===
Alpha solenoids feature prominently in the proteins making up the nuclear pore complex (NPC); alpha solenoid and beta propeller domains together account for up to half of the core NPC scaffold by mass. A large number of the conserved nucleoporin proteins forming the NPC are either alpha solenoid proteins or consist of a beta propeller domain at the N-terminus and an alpha solenoid at the C-terminus. This latter domain architecture also occurs in clathrin and Sec31, and was thought to be unique to eukaryotes, though a few examples have been reported in planctomycetes.

=== Vesicle coat proteins ===
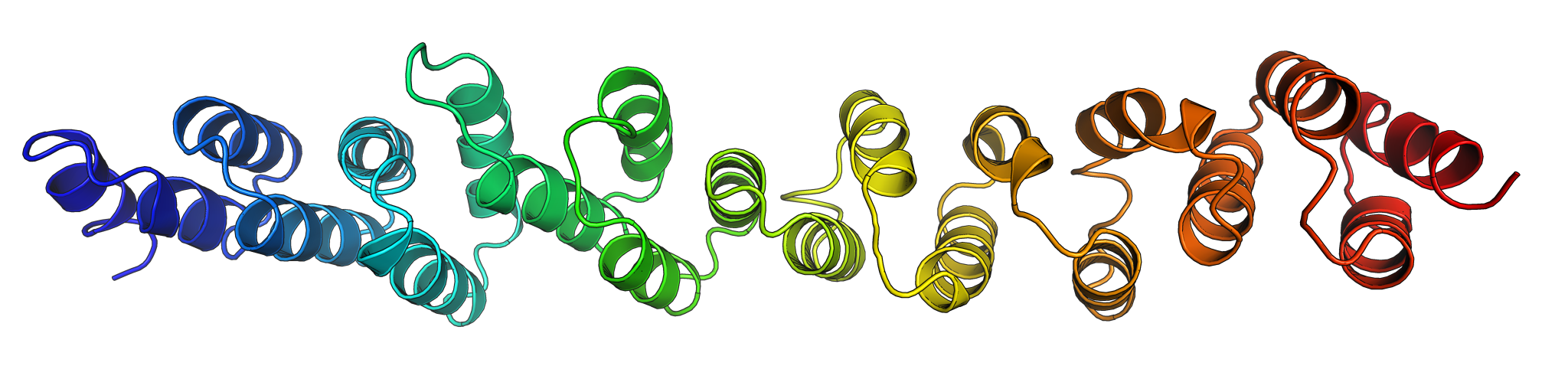
The structure of the clathrin heavy chain leg segment showing helical repeats, with the N-terminus in blue at left and the C-terminus in red at right.

Vesicle coat proteins frequently contain alpha solenoids and share common domain architecture with some NPC proteins. Three major coat complexes involved in distinct cellular pathways all contain alpha solenoid proteins: the clathrin/adaptin complex, which buds vesicles from the plasma membrane and is involved in endocytosis; the COPI complex, which buds vesicles from the Golgi apparatus and is associated with retrograde transport; and the COPII complex, which buds vesicles from the endoplasmic reticulum and is associated with anterograde transport.

=== Transport proteins ===
Due to their propensity for forming large interaction surfaces well-suited to protein-protein interactions, and their flexible surfaces permitting binding of various cargo molecules, alpha solenoid proteins commonly function as transport proteins, particularly in transport between the nucleus and the cytoplasm. For example, the beta-karyopherin superfamily consists of alpha solenoid proteins formed from HEAT repeats; importin beta is a member of this family, and its adaptor protein importin alpha is an alpha solenoid formed from Armadillo repeats. Transporters of other molecules, such as RNA, can also be of alpha solenoid architecture, as in exportin-5 or pentatricopeptide-repeat-containing RNA-binding proteins, which are particularly common in plants.

=== Regulatory proteins ===
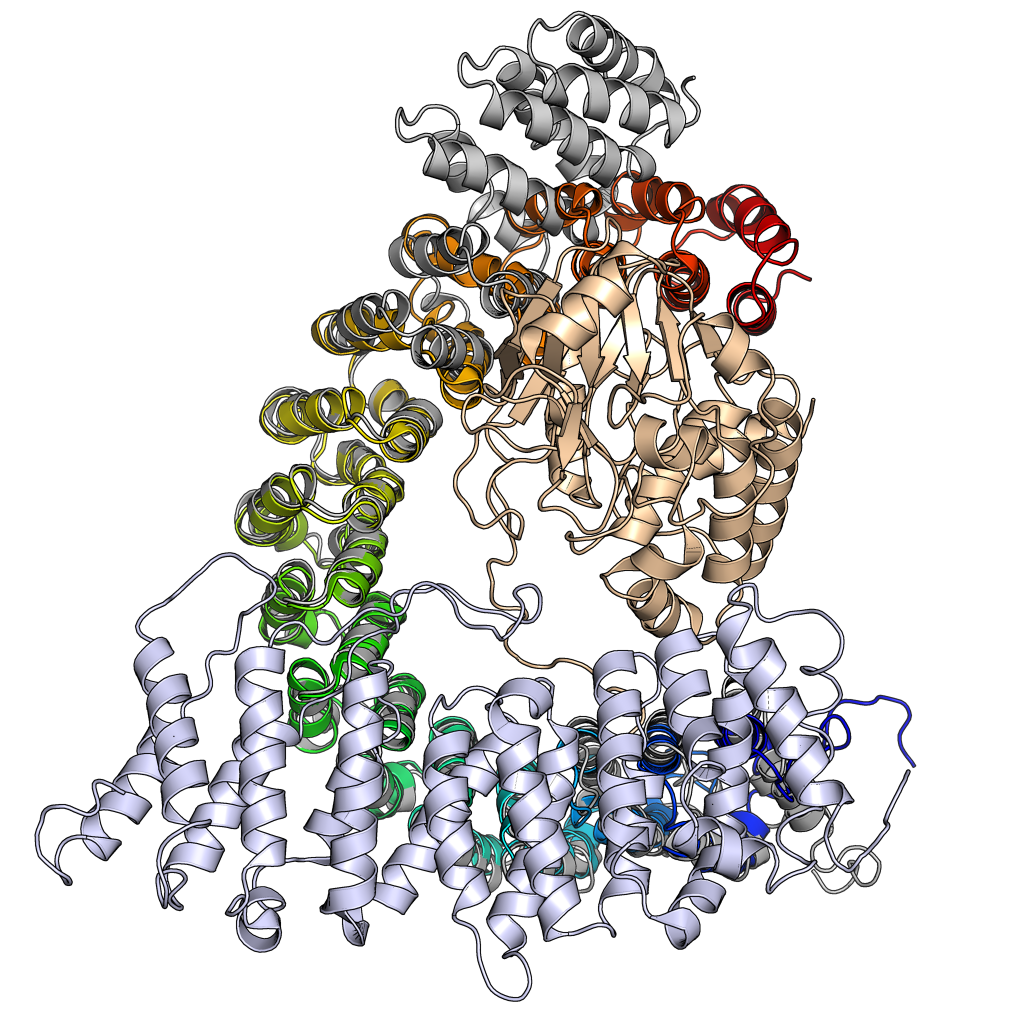
The assembled heterotrimer of protein phosphatase 2A. Subunit A, consisting of 15 HEAT repeats, is shown in rainbow color with the N-terminus in blue at bottom and the C-terminus in red at top. The regulatory subunit B, consisting of irregular pseudo-HEAT repeats, is shown in light blue. The catalytic subunit C is shown in tan. (All from PDB: 2IAE.) Superposed is the unbound form of the regulatory subunit B in gray (from PDB: 1B3U), illustrating the flexibility of this alpha solenoid protein. Conformational changes in HEAT repeat 11 result in flexing the C-terminal end of the protein to accommodate binding of the catalytic subunit.

The protein-protein interaction capacity of alpha solenoid proteins also makes them well suited to function as regulatory proteins. For example, regulatory subunit A (also known as PR65) of protein phosphatase 2A is a HEAT-repeat alpha solenoid whose conformational flexibility regulates access to the enzyme binding site.

== Taxonomic distribution ==
Alpha solenoid proteins are found in all domains of life; however, their frequencies in different proteomes vary significantly. They are rare in viruses and bacteria, somewhat more common in archaea, and quite common in eukaryotes. Many of the eukaryotic alpha solenoid proteins have detectable homologs only in other eukaryotes and are often restricted even further, to the chordates. Prokaryotic alpha solenoid proteins are concentrated in particular taxa, notably the cyanobacteria and planctomycetes, which have unusually complex intracellular compartmentalization relative to most prokaryotes.

== Evolution ==
Evolutionary relationships between different alpha solenoid proteins are difficult to trace due to the low sequence homology of the repeats. Convergent evolution of similar protein structures from ancestrally unrelated proteins is thought to be significant in the evolutionary history of this fold class.

=== Nuclear pore complexes and vesicle transport ===
The nuclear pore complex is an extremely large protein complex that mediates transit into and out of the cell nucleus. Homologous structures from which the NPC might have evolved have not been detected in prokaryotic transmembrane transport proteins; however, it has been suggested that the NPC components show distinct homology to vesicle coat proteins found in clathrin/adaptin, COPI, and COPII complexes. Most distinctively, a shared domain architecture consisting of an N-terminal beta propeller and a C-terminal alpha solenoid has been detected in both NPC and coat proteins, suggesting a possible common origin. An ancestral "protocoatomer" that diversified to acquire derived characteristics of all four modern complexes has been proposed.

Examination of the genome of Lokiarchaeum, thought to be among the closest archaeal relatives to eukaryotes, did not reveal any examples of the beta propeller/alpha solenoid domain architecture, although homologs of other proteins involved in eukaryotic membrane trafficking were identified. However, it is unclear whether this observation means that the propeller/solenoid architecture evolved later or was lost from modern lokiarchaea.

=== Membrane coat proteins in prokaryotes ===
A survey of the sequenced genomes of complex prokaryotes from the PVC superphylum (Planctomycetota-Verrucomicrobiota-Chlamydiota) identified examples of proteins with homology to eukaryotic membrane trafficking proteins, including examples of the distinctive beta-propeller/alpha-solenoid domain architecture previously believed to be unique to eukaryotes. The PVC superphylum is known for containing bacteria with unusually complex membrane morphology, and this discovery has been cited as evidence in favor of these organisms' status as an intermediate form between prokaryotes and eukaryotes. The planctomycete Gemmata obscuriglobus has exceptionally complex membrane architecture and has been a source of controversy in the literature regarding the possibility that it has a membrane-bound "nucleoid" compartment enclosing its DNA. The identification of proteins with sequence similarities to HEAT repeats in the G. obscuriglobus proteome has been interpreted as support for the membrane-bound nucleoid hypothesis; however, this has been disputed.

== Bioinformatics ==
Low sequence similarity among alpha solenoid proteins of similar structure has impeded their identification using bioinformatics methods, since the repeats are often not well defined in sequence. A large number of different computational methods have been developed to identify candidate alpha solenoid proteins based on their amino acid sequence.
