= Beta solenoid =

Component of protein

A beta solenoid is a protein fold composed of repeating beta strands subunits, arranged in antiparallel fashion to form a superhelix.

== Terminology and classification ==
Beta solenoids are part of the solenoid class of protein tandem repeats.

== Structure ==
Beta solenoids are elongated and potentially open-ended protein repeats characterized by beta strands winding around an imaginary axis, where the beta sheets are formed by sequences of consecutive repeat units.
