= Kelch motif =

Protein domain

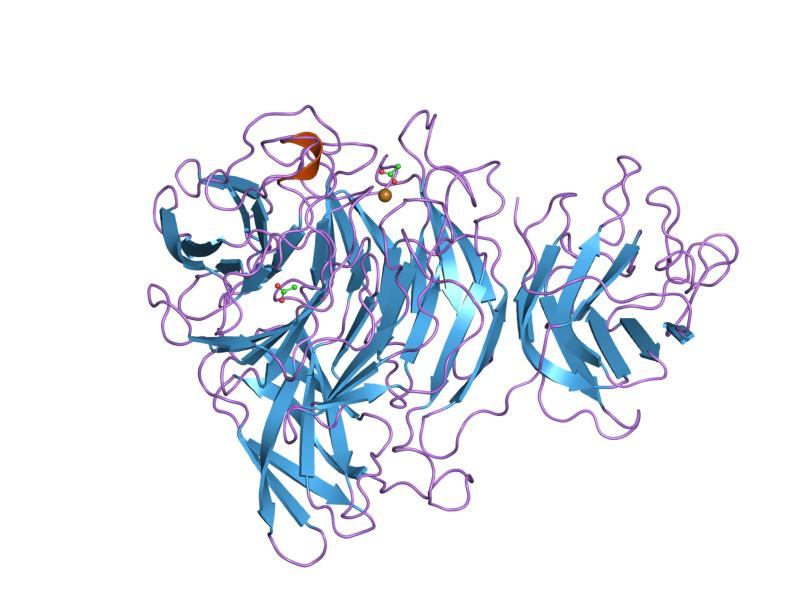
- Structure of Galactose oxidase containing kelch repeats.

Identifiers
- Symbol: Kelch_1
- Pfam: PF01344
- InterPro: IPR006652
- SMART: Kelch
- SCOP2: 1gof / SCOPe / SUPFAM
- OPM superfamily: 319
- OPM protein: 3ii7
Available protein structures:
- PDB: IPR006652 PF01344 (ECOD; PDBsum)
- AlphaFold: IPR006652; PF01344

Kelch motif

Identifiers
- Symbol: Kelch_2
- Pfam: PF07646
- Pfam clan: CL0186
- InterPro: IPR011498
- SCOP2: 1gof / SCOPe / SUPFAM
Available protein structures:
- PDB: IPR011498 PF07646 (ECOD; PDBsum)
- AlphaFold: IPR011498; PF07646

Galactose oxidase, central domain

Identifiers
- Symbol: Kelch_3
- Pfam: PF13415
- Pfam clan: CL0186
Available protein structures:
- PDB: PF13415 (ECOD; PDBsum)
- AlphaFold: PF13415

Galactose oxidase, central domain

Identifiers
- Symbol: Kelch_4
- Pfam: PF13418
- Pfam clan: CL0186
Available protein structures:
- PDB: PF13418 (ECOD; PDBsum)
- AlphaFold: PF13418

Kelch motif

Identifiers
- Symbol: Kelch_5
- Pfam: PF13854
- Pfam clan: CL0186
Available protein structures:
- PDB: PF13854 (ECOD; PDBsum)
- AlphaFold: PF13854

Kelch motif

Identifiers
- Symbol: Kelch_6
- Pfam: PF13964
- Pfam clan: CL0186
Available protein structures:
- PDB: PF13964 (ECOD; PDBsum)
- AlphaFold: PF13964

The Kelch motif is a region of protein sequence found widely in proteins from bacteria and eukaryotes. This sequence motif is composed of about 50 amino acid residues which form a structure of a four stranded beta-sheet "blade". This sequence motif is found in between five and eight tandem copies per protein which fold together to form a larger circular solenoid structure called a beta-propeller domain.

== Proteins containing Kelch motifs ==
The Kelch motif is widely found in eukaryotic and bacterial species. Notably the human genome contains around 100 proteins containing the Kelch motif. Within individual proteins the motif occurs multiple times. For example, the motif appears 6 times in Drosophila egg-chamber regulatory protein. The motif is also found in mouse protein MIPP and in a number of poxviruses. In addition, kelch repeats have been recognised in alpha- and beta-scruin, in galactose oxidase from the fungus Dactylium dendroides, and in the Escherichia coli NanM protein, a sialic acid mutarotase.

== Structure ==
The structure of galactose oxidase reveals that the repeated Kelch sequence motif corresponds to a 4-stranded anti-parallel beta-sheet motif that forms the repeat unit in a super-barrel structural fold commonly known as a beta propeller.

== Function ==
The known functions of kelch-containing proteins are diverse:

- scruin is an actin cross-linking protein;
- galactose oxidase catalyses the oxidation of the hydroxyl group at the C6 position in D-galactose;
- neuraminidase hydrolyses sialic acid residues from glycoproteins;
- NanM is a sialic acid mutarotase, involved in efficient utilisation of sialic acid by bacteria;
- kelch may have a cytoskeletal function, as it is localised to the actin-rich ring canals that connect the 15 nurse cells to the developing oocyte in Drosophila.

== See also ==
- WD40 repeat
- Kelch protein
