= Pentapeptide =

Pentapeptide may refer to:

- An oligopeptide formed from five amino acids
- Pentapeptide repeat
