= Toroid repeat proteins =

Protein structure

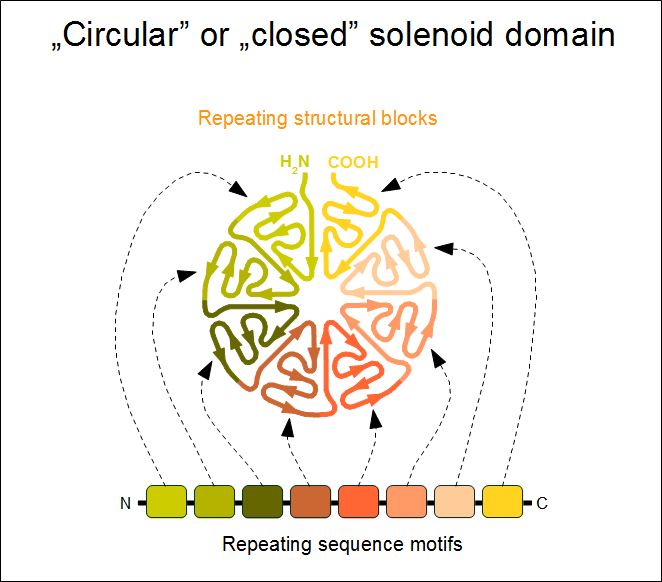
Toroid (closed) tandem repeat domain

A toroid repeat is a protein fold composed of repeating subunits, arranged in circular fashion to form a closed structure.

== Structure ==
In the case when the N- and C-terminal repeats lie in close physical contact in a tandem repeat domain, the result is a topologically compact, closed structure. Such domains typically display a high rotational symmetry (unlike open repeats that only have translational symmetries), and assume a wheel-like shape. Because of the limitations of this structure, the number of individual repeats is not arbitrary. In the case of WD40 repeats (perhaps the largest family of closed solenoids) the number of repeats can range from 4 to 10 (more usually between 5 and 7). Kelch repeats, beta-barrels and beta-trefoil repeats are further examples for this architecture.

== Function ==
Closed solenoids frequently function as protein-protein interaction modules: it is possible that all repeats must be present to form the ligand-binding site if it is located at the centre or axis of the domain "wheel". The WD40 repeat is a prime example of this function.

== Classification ==
The following major sub-classes of toroid repeat proteins can be found:

1. TIM barrel structures composed of eight units with alternating beta strands and alpha helices
2. Beta barrel structures composed on a single circular beta sheet
3. Beta propeller structures composed of beta sheets formed by individual repeat units arranged in a circle, in particular the WD40 repeat and Kelch motif families
