= C16orf96 =

Protein-coding gene in the species Homo sapiens

Identifiers
- Aliases: C16orf96, chromosome 16 open reading frame 96
- External IDs: MGI: 1926059; HomoloGene: 53527; GeneCards: C16orf96; OMA:C16orf96 - orthologs

Gene location (Human)
Chr.	Chromosome 16 (human)
Band	16p13.3	Start	4,556,340 bp
Band	16p13.3	End	4,600,758 bp

Gene location (Mouse)
Chr.	Chromosome 16 (mouse)
Band	16 A1|16 2.47 cM	Start	4,653,280 bp
Band	16 A1|16 2.47 cM	End	4,685,550 bp
RNA expression pattern
Bgee	Human / Mouse (ortholog); Top expressed in: testicle; left testis; right testis; prefrontal cortex; C1 segment; substantia nigra; ventricular zone; granulocyte; putamen; nucleus accumbens / Top expressed in: zygote; spermatid; secondary oocyte; seminiferous tubule; primary oocyte; neural layer of retina; ascending aorta; spermatocyte; aortic valve; embryo; More reference expression data
BioGPS	n/a
Orthologs
Species	Human	Mouse
Entrez	342346	78809
Ensembl	ENSG00000205832	ENSMUSG00000022518
UniProt	A6NNT2	E9QMW4
RefSeq (mRNA)	NM_001145011; NM_001387219	NM_001252142; NM_030192
RefSeq (protein)	NP_001138483	NP_084468
Location (UCSC)	Chr 16: 4.56 – 4.6 Mb	Chr 16: 4.65 – 4.69 Mb
PubMed search
- Wikidata
View/Edit Human	View/Edit Mouse

C16orf96, or chromosome 16 open reading frame 96, is a protein in humans that is encoded by C16orf96 that is found on the 16th chromosome. In Homo sapiens, the protein is 1141 amino acids in length

== Protein ==
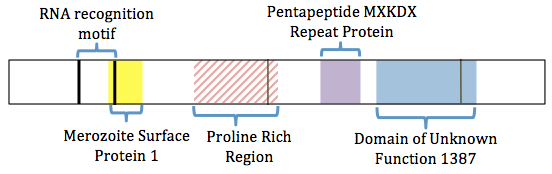
The structure of human C16orf96 protein with important regions labeled. The dark grey lines within the proline rich region and the domain of unknown function are nuclear import and export signals, respectively.

=== Characteristics ===
The molecular weight of the processed C16orf96 protein in humans is 125kdal with an isoelectric point of 6.58 About 9% of the amino acid makeup of C16orf96 is proline, which is significantly higher than an average human gene.

=== Post Translational Modification ===
Human C16orf96 has a large amount of predicted phosphorylation sites on serines throughout the protein. C16orf96 also has been found in primates and mammals to have both a nuclear import and export signal

=== Domains ===
This gene contains some known domains, such as: an RNA recognition motif, a Merozoite surface protein (MSP-1), a pentapeptide repeat MXKDX, and a domain of unknown function (DUF1387). These domains could give a hint of what the function of this gene is.

=== Structure ===
==== Secondary Structure ====
The majority of the secondary structure of C16orf96 is alpa-helices with coils being the second most abundant structure.

==== Tertiary Structure ====
At this time there is no known tertiary structure for C16orf96.

=== Cellular Localization ===
The C16orf96 protein is predicted to be localized in the nucleus 82% of the time and 4.5% of the time in the cytosol and 4.5% of the time in the mitochondria.

== Expression ==
Expression of C16orf96 when different hypoxia-inducible factors are reduced

C16orf96 expression is generally low in cells. in situ hybridization experiments suggest that C16orf96 RNA is only expressed in the testis while the EST profile for C16orf96 shows gene expression is low in testis and skin only. Expression of the C16orf96 gene is modulated by the depletion of both hypoxia induced factor 1/2α (HIF1/2α). When only one of the factors is depleted expression does not change suggesting that there is redundancy with these two HIF.

== Homology ==
Strict orthologs of this gene exist only in mammals. However, a portion of DUF1387 is found in more distant species back to reptiles. No orthologs of this gene can be found in plants, fungi, or bacteria. Suggesting that this gene is relatively new and evolves quickly.

== Function ==
The function of C16orf96 is currently unknown. Studies have cited this gene among many other genes as a possible candidate that has an effect on childhood obesity.
