= HEAT repeat =

Protein domain

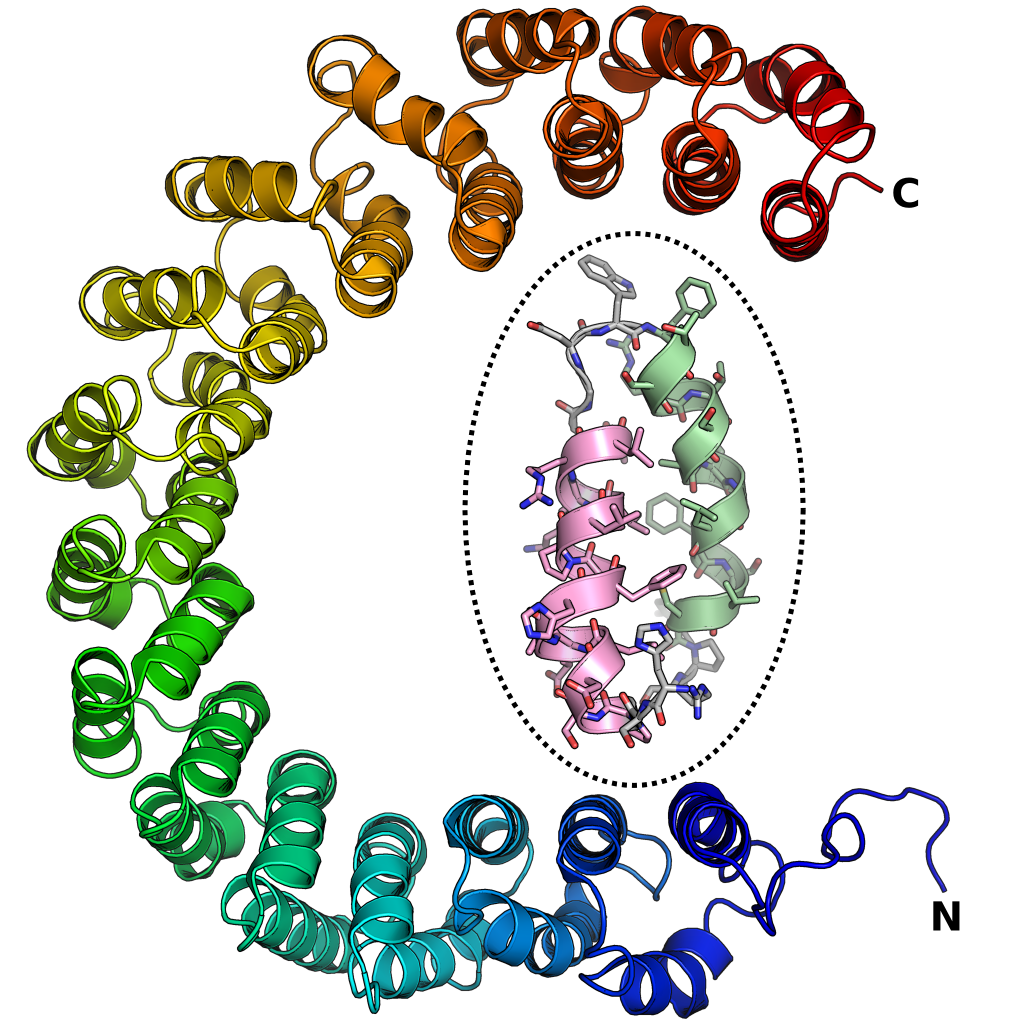
- An example of an alpha solenoid structure composed of 15 HEAT repeats. The protein phosphatase 2A regulatory subunit is shown with the N-terminus in blue at bottom and the C-terminus in red at top. A single helix-turn-helix motif is shown in the center with the outer helix in pink, the inner helix in green, and the turn in white. From PDB: 2IAE.

Identifiers
- Symbol: HEAT
- Pfam: PF02985
- InterPro: IPR000357
- PROSITE: PDOC50077
- SCOP2: 1b3u / SCOPe / SUPFAM
Available protein structures:
- PDB: 1b3u, 1f59, 1gcj, 1ibr, 1m5n, 1o6o, 1o6p, 1qbk, 1qgr, 1u6g, 1ukl, 2bku IPR000357 PF02985 (ECOD; PDBsum)
- AlphaFold: IPR000357; PF02985

A HEAT repeat is a protein tandem repeat structural motif composed of two alpha helices linked by a short loop. HEAT repeats can form alpha solenoids, a type of solenoid protein domain found in a number of cytoplasmic proteins. The name "HEAT" is an acronym for four proteins in which this repeat structure is found: Huntingtin, elongation factor 3 (EF3), protein phosphatase 2A (PP2A), and the yeast kinase TOR1. HEAT repeats form extended superhelical structures which are often involved in intracellular transport; they are structurally related to armadillo repeats. The nuclear transport protein importin beta contains 19 HEAT repeats.

== Various HEAT repeat proteins and their structures ==
Representative examples of HEAT repeat proteins include importin β (also known as karyopherin β) family, regulatory subunits of condensin and cohesin, separase, PIKKs (phosphatidylinositol 3-kinase-related protein kinases) such as ATM (Ataxia telangiectasia mutated) and ATR (Ataxia telangiectasia and Rad3 related), and the microtubule-binding protein XMAP215/Dis1/TOG and CLASP. Thus, cellular functions of HEAT repeat proteins are highly variable.

The structure of the following HEAT repeat proteins have been determined so far:

- Protein modification and degradation
  - A subunit and holoenzyme of PP2A
  - SCFubiquitin ligase regulator Cand1
  - Hsm3, a molecular chaperon involved in the assembly of 26Sproteasome
- Nucleo-cytoplasmic transport
  - Importin β
  - Exportin Cse1
  - Transportin 1
  - Nuleoporin Gle1; Nup188; Nup192
- Transcriptional regulation
  - TFIID subunit TAF6
  - TBP regulator Mot1 (Modifier of transcription 1)
  - Transcriptional initiation factor Rrn3
- Translational regulation
  - Elongation factor eEF3
  - Initiation factor eIF4G
  - Aminoacyl tRNA synthetase transfer protein Cex1p
- DNA repair
  - DNA-PK (DNA-dependent protein kinase)
  - Fanconi anemia responsible protein FANCF (FANCF)
  - Damaged DNA-binding protein AlkD (Alkylpurin DNA glycosylase)
  - PIKKs chaperone Tel2
- Chromosomal regulation
  - Cohesin subunit SA2/Scc3
  - Cohesin regulator Wapl
  - Cohesin regulator Pds5
  - Cohesin loading factor Scc2
  - Cohesin protease Separase
  - Condensin subunit CAP-G/ycg1
  - Condensin subunit CAP-D2/ycs4
- Cytoskeletal regulation
  - Microtubule-binding protein TOG/Stu2
- Cell proliferation regulation
  - TOR (target of rapamycin)
- Others
  - API5 (Apoptosis inhibitor 5)
  - V-type ATPase H subunit
