= ILF3 =

Protein-coding gene in the species Homo sapiens

Identifiers
- Aliases: ILF3, CBTF, DRBF, DRBP76, MMP4, MPHOSPH4, MPP4, NF-AT-90, NF110, NF110b, NF90, NF90a, NF90b, NFAR, NFAR-1, NFAR2, TCP110, TCP80, interleukin enhancer binding factor 3, NFAR110, MPP4110, NFAR-2, NF90c, NFAR90, NF90ctv
- External IDs: OMIM: 603182; MGI: 1339973; GeneCards: ILF3
Available structures
PDB	Ortholog search: PDBe RCSB
PDB	List of PDB id codes 2L33, 3P1X

Gene location (Human)
Chr.	Chromosome 19 (human)
Band	19p13.2	Start	10,654,261 bp
Band	19p13.2	End	10,692,417 bp

Gene location (Mouse)
Chr.	Chromosome 9 (mouse)
Band	9 A3|9 7.78 cM	Start	21,279,167 bp
Band	9 A3|9 7.78 cM	End	21,316,657 bp
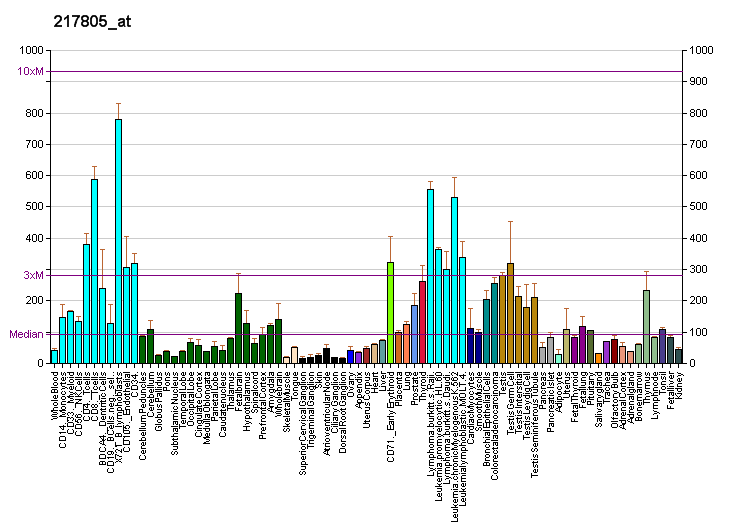

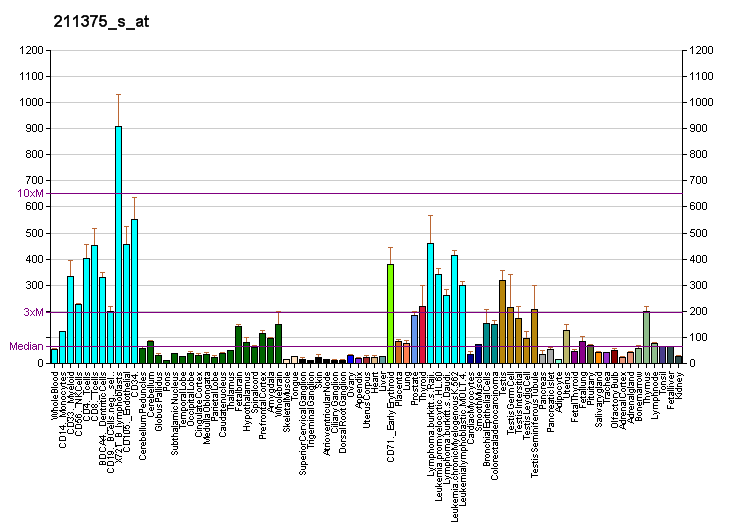

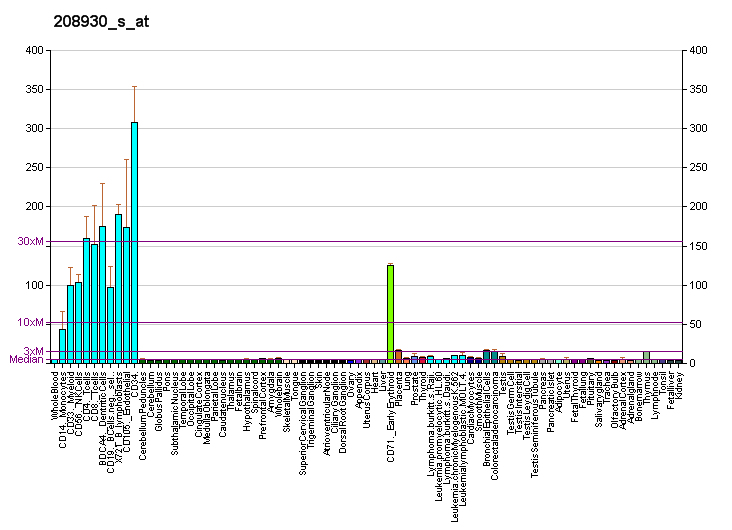
RNA expression pattern
Bgee	Human / Mouse (ortholog); Top expressed in: ganglionic eminence; ventricular zone; sural nerve; left ovary; right ovary; right uterine tube; left lobe of thyroid gland; anterior pituitary; right lobe of thyroid gland; left uterine tube / Top expressed in: tail of embryo; genital tubercle; ventricular zone; epiblast; urethra; neural layer of retina; ganglionic eminence; primitive streak; mandibular prominence; maxillary prominence; More reference expression data
BioGPS	More reference expression data
Gene ontology
Molecular function	protein binding; DNA binding; double-stranded RNA binding; RNA binding; single-stranded RNA binding; mRNA 3'-UTR AU-rich region binding
Cellular component	membrane; nucleoplasm; mitochondrion; cytoplasm; nucleolus; nucleus; extracellular region; ribonucleoprotein complex
Biological process	defense response to virus; positive regulation of transcription, DNA-templated; transcription, DNA-templated; negative regulation of transcription, DNA-templated; regulation of transcription, DNA-templated; protein phosphorylation; negative regulation of viral genome replication; negative regulation of translation
Sources:Amigo / QuickGO
Orthologs
Databases	NCBI: entry; OMA: entry
Species	Human	Mouse
Entrez	3609	16201
Ensembl	ENSG00000129351	ENSMUSG00000032178
UniProt	Q12906	Q9Z1X4
RefSeq (mRNA)	NM_001137673; NM_004516; NM_012218; NM_017620; NM_153464	NM_001042707; NM_001042708; NM_001042709; NM_001277321; NM_001277322 NM_010561
RefSeq (protein)	NP_001131145; NP_004507; NP_036350; NP_060090; NP_703194	NP_001036172; NP_001036173; NP_001036174; NP_001264250; NP_001264251 NP_034691
Location (UCSC)	Chr 19: 10.65 – 10.69 Mb	Chr 9: 21.28 – 21.32 Mb
PubMed search
- Wikidata
View/Edit Human	View/Edit Mouse

Interleukin enhancer-binding factor 3 is a protein that in humans is encoded by the ILF3 gene.

== Function ==
Nuclear factor of activated T-cells (NFAT) is a transcription factor required for T-cell expression of interleukin 2. NFAT binds to a sequence in the IL2 enhancer known as the antigen receptor response element 2. In addition, NFAT can bind RNA and is an essential component for encapsidation and protein priming of hepatitis B viral polymerase. NFAT is a heterodimer of 45 kDa and 90 kDa proteins, the larger of which is the product of this gene. The encoded protein, which is primarily localized to ribosomes, probably regulates transcription at the level of mRNA elongation. At least three transcript variants encoding three different isoforms have been found for this gene.

== Interactions ==
ILF3 has been shown to interact with:

- DNA-PKcs,
- FUS,
- PRMT1
- Protein kinase R, and
- XPO5.
- C5orf36

Small NF90/ILF3-associated RNAs (snaR) (~120 nucleotides long) and are known to interact with ILF3 double-stranded RNA-binding motifs. snaR-A is abundant in human testis and has been shown to associate with ribosomes in HeLa cells. snaR-A is present in human and gorilla but not in chimpanzee. Other snaR RNAs are found in African Great Apes (including chimpanzee and bonobo).

ILF2 and ILF3 have been identified as autoantigens in mice with induced lupus, in canine systemic rheumatic autoimmune disease, and as a rare finding in humans with autoimmune disease.
