= Leucine-rich repeat =

Protein domain

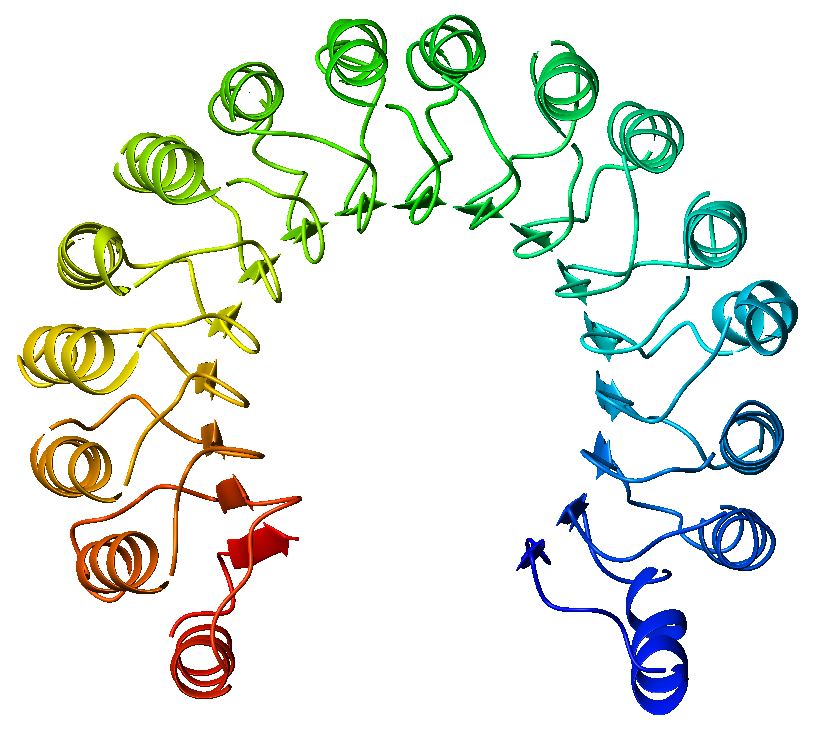
- An example of a leucine-rich repeat protein, a porcine ribonuclease inhibitor

Identifiers
- Symbol: LRR_1
- Pfam: PF00560
- Pfam clan: CL0022
- ECOD: 207.1.1
- InterPro: IPR001611
- SCOP2: 2bnh / SCOPe / SUPFAM
- Membranome: 605
Available protein structures:
- PDB: IPR001611 PF00560 (ECOD; PDBsum)
- AlphaFold: IPR001611; PF00560

Leucine rich repeat variant
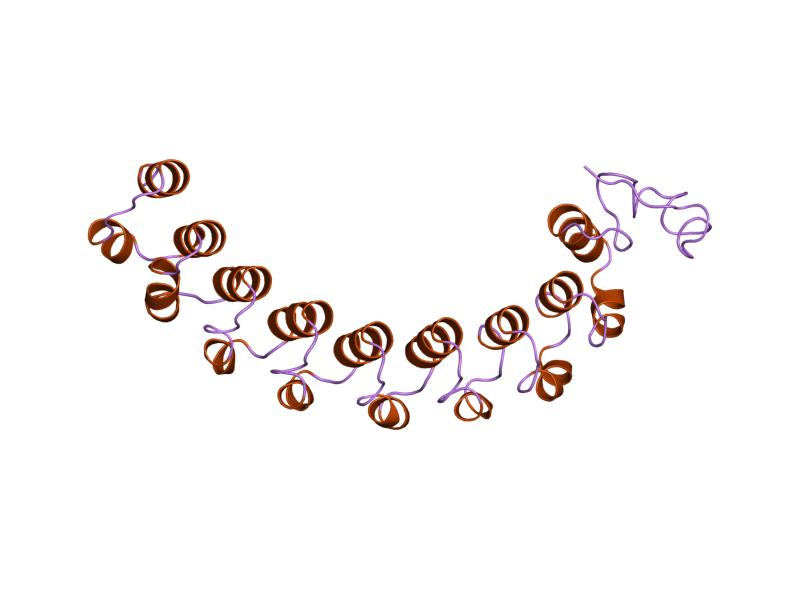
- a leucine-rich repeat variant with a novel repetitive protein structural motif

Identifiers
- Symbol: LRV
- Pfam: PF01816
- Pfam clan: CL0020
- InterPro: IPR004830
- SCOP2: 1lrv / SCOPe / SUPFAM
- Membranome: 737
Available protein structures:
- PDB: IPR004830 PF01816 (ECOD; PDBsum)
- AlphaFold: IPR004830; PF01816

LRR adjacent
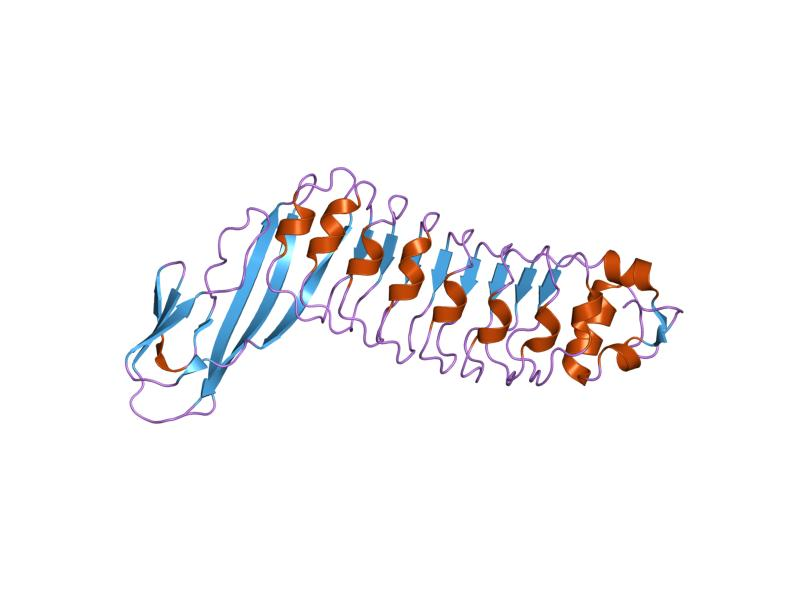
- internalin h: crystal structure of fused n-terminal domains.

Identifiers
- Symbol: LRR_adjacent
- Pfam: PF08191
- InterPro: IPR012569
- Membranome: 341
Available protein structures:
- PDB: IPR012569 PF08191 (ECOD; PDBsum)
- AlphaFold: IPR012569; PF08191

Leucine rich repeat N-terminal domain
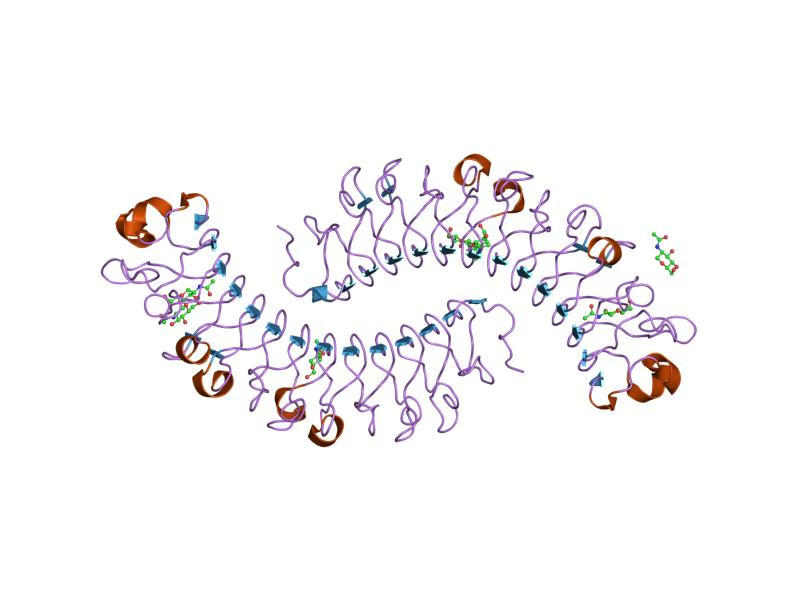
- dimeric bovine tissue-extracted decorin, crystal form 2

Identifiers
- Symbol: LRRNT
- Pfam: PF01462
- InterPro: IPR000372
- SMART: LRRNT
- SCOP2: 1m10 / SCOPe / SUPFAM
- Membranome: 127
Available protein structures:
- PDB: IPR000372 PF01462 (ECOD; PDBsum)
- AlphaFold: IPR000372; PF01462

Leucine rich repeat N-terminal domain
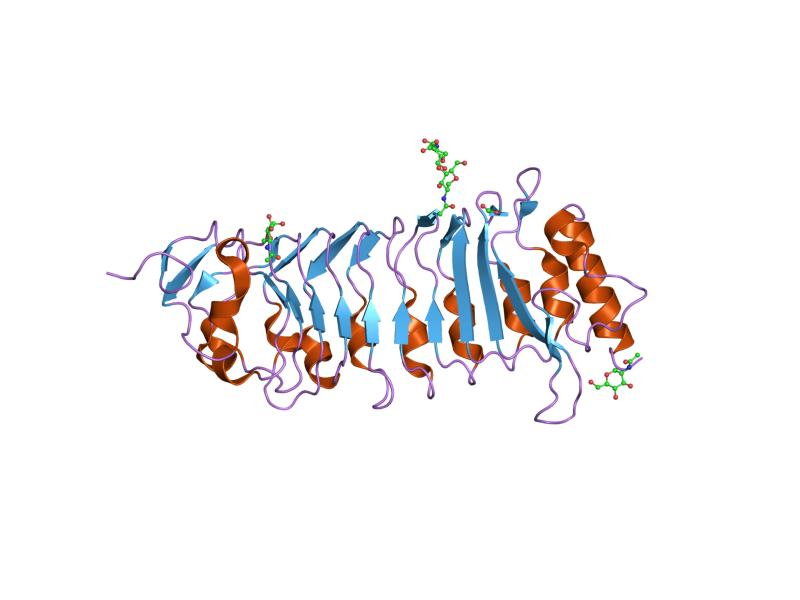
- the crystal structure of pgip (polygalacturonase inhibiting protein), a leucine rich repeat protein involved in plant defense

Identifiers
- Symbol: LRRNT_2
- Pfam: PF08263
- InterPro: IPR013210
- SMART: LRRNT
- SCOP2: 1m10 / SCOPe / SUPFAM
Available protein structures:
- PDB: IPR013210 PF08263 (ECOD; PDBsum)
- AlphaFold: IPR013210; PF08263

Leucine rich repeat C-terminal domain
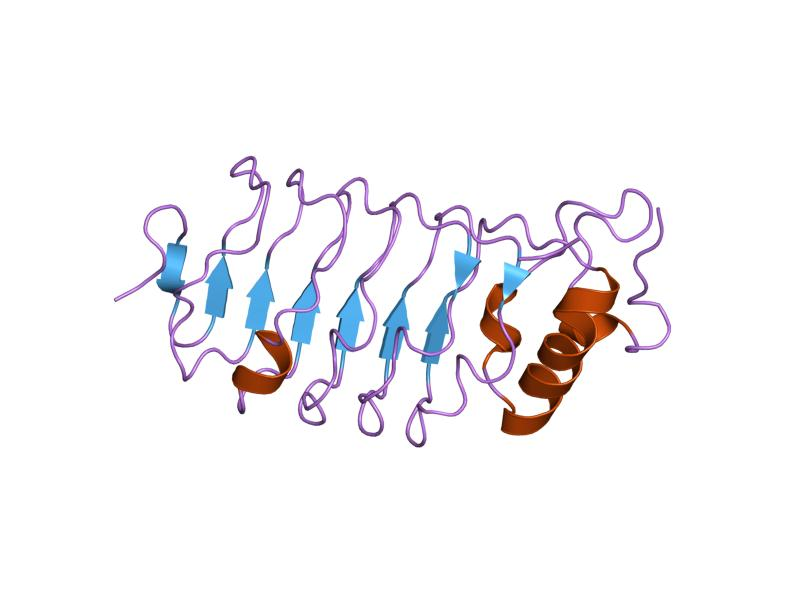
- third lrr domain of drosophila slit

Identifiers
- Symbol: LRRCT
- Pfam: PF01463
- InterPro: IPR000483
- SMART: LRRCT
- SCOP2: 1m10 / SCOPe / SUPFAM
Available protein structures:
- PDB: IPR000483 PF01463 (ECOD; PDBsum)
- AlphaFold: IPR000483; PF01463

LRV protein FeS4 cluster
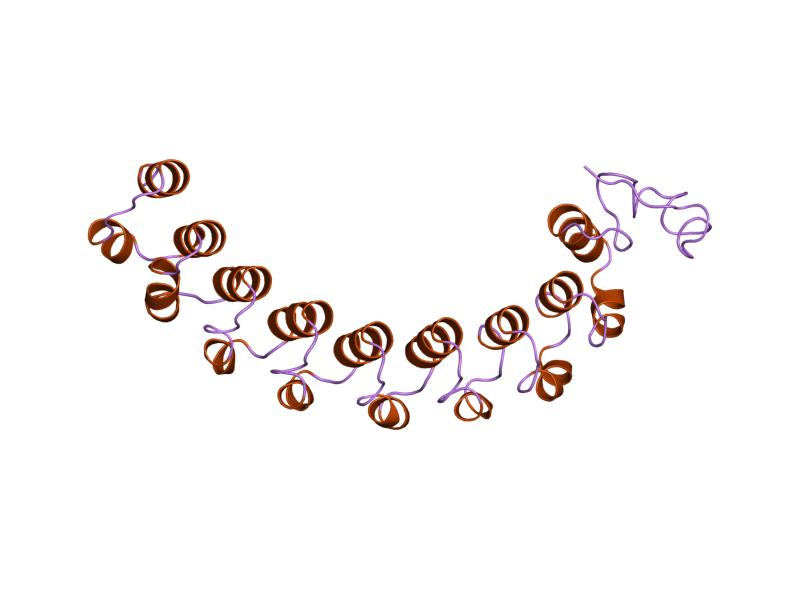
- a leucine-rich repeat variant with a novel repetitive protein structural motif

Identifiers
- Symbol: LRV_FeS
- Pfam: PF05484
- Pfam clan: CL0020
- InterPro: IPR008665
- SCOP2: 1lrv / SCOPe / SUPFAM
Available protein structures:
- PDB: IPR008665 PF05484 (ECOD; PDBsum)
- AlphaFold: IPR008665; PF05484

A leucine-rich repeat (LRR) is a protein structural motif that forms an α/β horseshoe fold. It is composed of repeating 20–30 amino acid stretches that are unusually rich in the hydrophobic amino acid leucine. These tandem repeats commonly fold together to form a solenoid protein domain, termed leucine-rich repeat domain. Typically, each repeat unit has beta strand-turn-alpha helix structure, and the assembled domain, composed of many such repeats, has a horseshoe shape with an interior parallel beta sheet and an exterior array of helices. One face of the beta sheet and one side of the helix array are exposed to solvent and are therefore dominated by hydrophilic residues. The region between the helices and sheets is the protein's hydrophobic core and is tightly sterically packed with leucine residues.

Leucine-rich repeats are frequently involved in the formation of protein–protein interactions.

== Examples ==
Leucine-rich repeat motifs have been identified in a large number of functionally unrelated proteins. The best-known example is the ribonuclease inhibitor, but other proteins such as the tropomyosin regulator tropomodulin and the toll-like receptor also share the motif. In fact, the toll-like receptor possesses 10 successive LRR motifs which serve to bind pathogen- and danger-associated molecular patterns. Similarly, plants possess nucleotide-binding leucine-rich repeat receptors (NLRs), which are involved in the recognition of pathogenic effector (biology) proteins or the effector mediated changes of plant proteins.

Although the canonical LRR protein contains approximately one helix for every beta strand, variants that form beta-alpha superhelix folds sometimes have long loops rather than helices linking successive beta strands.

One leucine-rich repeat variant domain (LRV) has a novel repetitive structural motif consisting of alternating alpha- and 3_{10}-helices arranged in a right-handed superhelix, with the absence of the beta-sheets present in other leucine-rich repeats.

== Associated domains ==
Leucine-rich repeats are often flanked by N-terminal and C-terminal cysteine-rich domains, but not always as is the case with C5orf36

They also co-occur with LRR adjacent domains. These are small, all beta strand domains, which have been structurally described for the protein Internalin (InlA) and related proteins InlB, InlE, InlH from the pathogenic bacterium Listeria monocytogenes. Their function appears to be mainly structural: They are fused to the C-terminal end of leucine-rich repeats, significantly stabilising the LRR, and forming a common rigid entity with the LRR. They are themselves not involved in protein-protein-interactions but help to present the adjacent LRR-domain for this purpose. These domains belong to the family of Ig-like domains in that they consist of two sandwiched beta sheets that follow the classical connectivity of Ig-domains. The beta strands in one of the sheets is, however, much smaller than in most standard Ig-like domains, making it somewhat of an outlier.

An iron sulphur cluster is found at the N-terminus of some proteins containing the leucine-rich repeat variant domain (LRV). These proteins have a two-domain structure, composed of a small N-terminal domain containing a cluster of four Cysteine residues that houses the 4Fe:4S cluster, and a larger C-terminal domain containing the LRV repeats. Biochemical studies revealed that the 4Fe:4S cluster is sensitive to oxygen, but does not appear to have reversible redox activity.

== See also ==
- Leucine zipper
