= Armadillo repeat =

Armadillo repeat domain
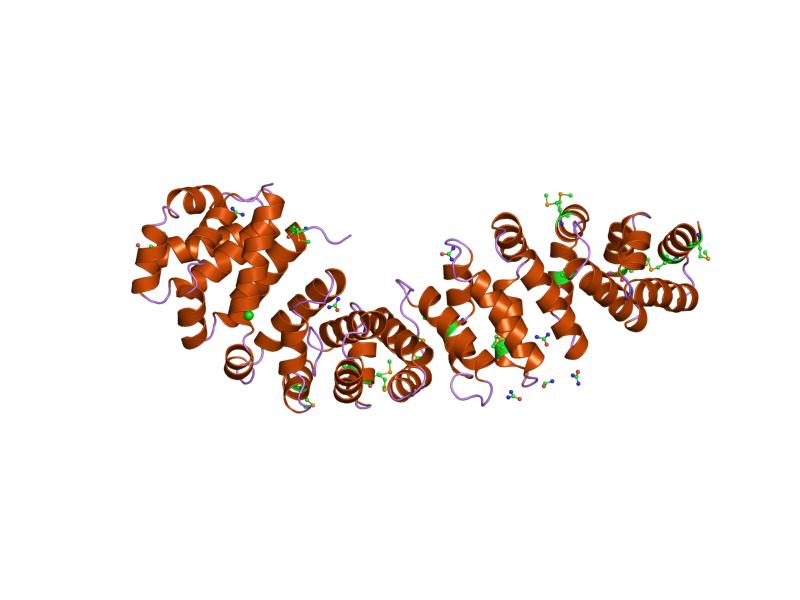
- Structure of the armadillo domain of β-catenin.

Identifiers
- Symbol: Arm
- Pfam: PF00514
- Pfam clan: CL0020
- InterPro: IPR000225
- SMART: SM00185
- PROSITE: PS50176
- SCOP2: 3bct / SCOPe / SUPFAM
- CDD: cd00020
- Membranome: 350
Available protein structures:
- Pfam: structures / ECOD
- PDB: RCSB PDB; PDBe; PDBj
- PDBsum: structure summary

An armadillo repeat is a characteristic, repetitive amino acid sequence of about 42 residues in length that is found in many proteins. Proteins that contain armadillo repeats typically contain several tandemly repeated copies. Each armadillo repeat is composed of a pair of alpha helices that form a hairpin structure. Multiple copies of the repeat form what is known as an alpha solenoid structure.

Examples of proteins that contain armadillo repeats include β-catenin, Sarm1 (SARM1), α-importin, plakoglobin, adenomatous polyposis coli (APC), and many others.

The term armadillo derives from the historical name of the β-catenin gene in the fruitfly Drosophila, where the armadillo repeat was first discovered. Although β-catenin was previously believed to be a protein involved in linking cadherin cell adhesion proteins to the cytoskeleton, recent work indicates that β-catenin regulates the homodimerization of alpha-catenin, which in turn controls actin branching and bundling. But, the armadillo repeat is found in a wide range of proteins with other functions. This type of protein domain is important in transducing WNT signals during embryonic development.

== Structure ==
The 3-dimensional fold of an armadillo repeat was first observed in the crystal structure of β-catenin, where the 12 tandem repeats form a superhelix of alpha helices with three helices per unit. The cylindrical structure features a positively charged groove, which presumably interacts with the acidic surfaces of the known interaction partners of β-catenin.
