= XPO5 =

Identifiers
- Aliases: XPO5, exp5, exportin 5
- External IDs: OMIM: 607845; MGI: 1913789; GeneCards: XPO5
Available structures
PDB	Ortholog search: PDBe RCSB
PDB	List of PDB id codes 3A6P

Gene location (Human)
Chr.	Chromosome 6 (human)
Band	6p21.1	Start	43,522,334 bp
Band	6p21.1	End	43,576,038 bp

Gene location (Mouse)
Chr.	Chromosome 17 (mouse)
Band	17|17 C	Start	46,513,708 bp
Band	17|17 C	End	46,554,524 bp
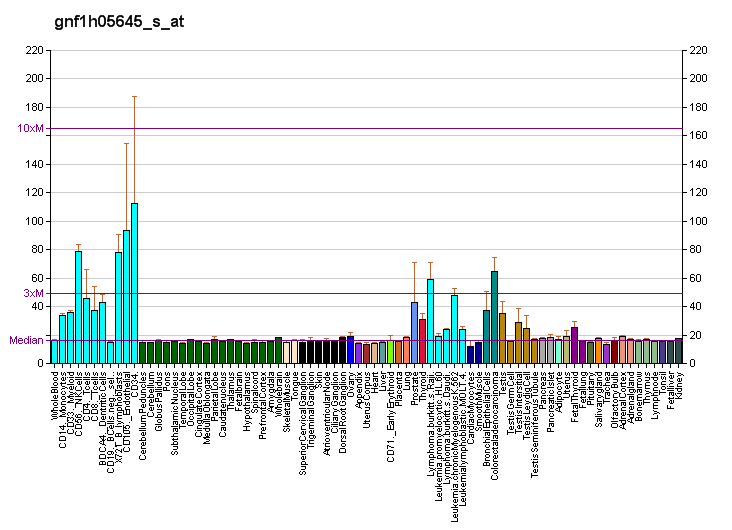
RNA expression pattern
Bgee	Human / Mouse (ortholog); Top expressed in: gonad; skin of arm; testicle; left testis; right testis; body of pancreas; ganglionic eminence; ventricular zone; bone marrow cell; skin of leg / Top expressed in: gallbladder; superior surface of tongue; tail of embryo; epiblast; mandibular prominence; maxillary prominence; interventricular septum; genital tubercle; ventricular zone; spermatocyte; More reference expression data
BioGPS	More reference expression data
Gene ontology
Molecular function	tRNA binding; mRNA binding; protein binding; RNA binding; nuclear export signal receptor activity; pre-miRNA binding
Cellular component	cytoplasm; RNA nuclear export complex; nucleus; nucleoplasm; cytosol; nuclear RNA export factor complex
Biological process	protein export from nucleus; positive regulation of RNA interference; protein transport; intracellular protein transport; miRNA metabolic process; gene silencing; regulation of protein export from nucleus; pre-miRNA export from nucleus; transport; nuclear export
Sources:Amigo / QuickGO
Orthologs
Databases	NCBI: entry; OMA: entry
Species	Human	Mouse
Entrez	57510	72322
Ensembl	ENSG00000124571	ENSMUSG00000067150
UniProt	Q9HAV4	Q924C1
RefSeq (mRNA)	NM_020750	NM_028198
RefSeq (protein)	NP_065801	NP_082474
Location (UCSC)	Chr 6: 43.52 – 43.58 Mb	Chr 17: 46.51 – 46.55 Mb
PubMed search
- Wikidata
View/Edit Human	View/Edit Mouse

Exportin-5 (XPO5) is a protein that, in humans, is encoded by the XPO5 gene. In eukaryotic cells, the primary purpose of XPO5 is to export pre-microRNA (also known as pre-miRNA) out of the nucleus and into the cytoplasm, for further processing by the Dicer enzyme. Once in the cytoplasm, the microRNA (also known as miRNA) can act as a gene silencer by regulating translation of mRNA. Although XPO5 is primarily involved in the transport of pre-miRNA, it has also been reported to transport tRNA.

Much research on XPO5 is ongoing. miRNA is a prominent research topic due to its potential use as a therapeutic, with several miRNA-based drugs already in use.

== Mechanism ==
=== Binding to pre-miRNA ===
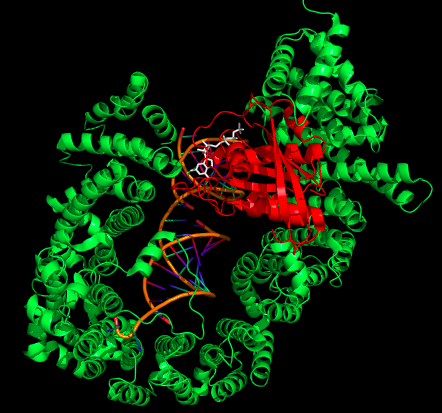
Image of XPO5 ternary complex generated in PyMol from crystal structure entry 3A6P in the Protein Data Bank. XPO5 is labeled green, Ran is labeled red, RNA is multi-colored, and GTP is labeled white.

After RanGTP binds to XPO5, the XPO5-RanGTP complex forms a U-like structure to hold the pre-miRNA. The XPO5-RanGTP complex recognizes pre-miRNA by its two-nucleotide 3’ overhang—a sequence consisting of two bases at the 3’ end of the pre-miRNA that are not paired with other bases. This motif is unique to pre-miRNA, and by recognizing it XPO5 ensures specificity for transporting only pre-miRNA. On its own, pre-miRNA is in a “closed” conformation, with the 3’ overhang flipped up toward the RNA minor groove. However, upon binding to XPO5, the 3’ overhang is flipped downwards away from the rest of the pre-miRNA molecule into an “open” conformation. This helps the backbone phosphates of these two nucleotides form hydrogen bonds with many XPO5 residues, allowing XPO5 to recognize the RNA as pre-miRNA. Because these interactions involve only the RNA phosphate backbone, they are nonspecific and allow XPO5 to recognize and transport any pre-miRNA. The rest of the pre-miRNA stem binds to XPO5 via interactions between the negatively-charged phosphate backbone and several positively-charged interior XPO5 residues.

=== XPO5 ternary complex transport mechanism ===
The combined structure of XPO5, RanGTP, and pre-miRNA is known as the ternary complex. Once the ternary complex is formed, it diffuses through a nuclear pore complex into the cytoplasm, transporting pre-miRNA into the cytoplasm in the process. Once in the cytoplasm, RanGAP hydrolyzes GTP to GDP, causing a conformational change that releases the pre-miRNA into the cytoplasm.

=== Export out of the nucleus ===
It has been suggested, through evidence provided by contour maps of water density, that the interior of XPO5 is hydrophilic, while the exterior of XPO5 is hydrophobic. Therefore, this enhances the binding capabilities of XPO5 to the nuclear pore complex, allowing for transport of the ternary complex out of the nucleus.

== Additional interactions ==
XPO5 has been shown to interact with ILF3 and Ran.

== Potential oncogenic role ==
Recent evidence has shown higher levels of XPO5 in prostate cancer cell lines in-vitro, suggesting that altered XPO5 expression levels may have a role in cancer development. Suppressing XPO5 has also been found to be therapeutic in-vitro. It has also been shown to function as an oncogene in colorectal cancer.
