= Importin α =

Class of adaptor proteins

Importin alpha, or karyopherin alpha refers to a class of adaptor proteins that are involved in the import of proteins into the cell nucleus. They are a sub-family of karyopherin proteins.

Importin α is known to bind to the nuclear localization signal (NLS) sequence of nucleus targeted proteins. After this recognition, importin α links the protein to importin β, which transports the NLS-containing protein across the nuclear envelope to its destination. Because of their complementary functional relationship, importin α and importin β are often referred to as the importin α/β heterodimer, but they are functionally separate, and do not normally exist in conjugation with each other, but only associate for cellular import processes, thus importin α proteins constitute an independent class of adaptor protein.

== Structure ==
Importin α is a small protein consisting of three functionally distinct domains: the IBB domain, ARM domain, and exportin CAS binding domain.

The N-terminal region of the proteins consists of an importin-β-binding, or IBB, domain. This region of the protein is responsible for interaction with importin β. This region has been described as a series of at least 41 essential amino acid residues, specifically positions 10-50 of the protein. Deletion of a single one of these amino acids has been shown to decrease nuclear import activity by around 50%. Larger deletions correlate with even greater losses of function of the ternary import complex made up of importin α, importin β, and the targeted protein.

The majority of the importin α protein is made up of a series of ten tandem armadillo, or ARM, repeats. A centralized ARM domain, consisting of nine of the ARM repeats, is responsible for regulating the NLS binding to directly interact with nucleus targeted proteins. These ARM repeats recognize the basic residues that are characteristic of NLS sequences. NLS sequences can be monopartite (single cluster of basic amino acids) or bipartite (two clusters of basic amino acids with a linker sequence). The ARM domain contains two binding sites within, allowing a single importin α molecule to interact with two monopartite NLS-containing proteins or a single bipartite NLS protein.

The C-terminus domain of importin α, which include the tenth ARM repeat, is responsible for interacting with exportin CAS, another karyopherin protein that functions in recycling importin α from the nucleus back into the cytoplasm of the cell. The association of this exportin CAS binding domain is Ran-GTP dependent, and hydrolysis of GTP leads to dissociation of importin α from the exportin CAS-Ran complex.

NLS binding to the ARM domain, and thereby the formation of the import complex, is regulated by the IBB domain of importin α. The IBB domain of importin α molecules contain many basic amino acid residues, similar to those found in NLS sequences. This similarity in structure leads to the ability of the IBB domain to fold inward and occupy the NLS binding sites when there is not importin β molecule associated with the importin α. This auto-inhibition mechanism prevents importin α from binding NLS containing proteins unless there is already an importin β associated ensuring that binding does not occur before all necessary import machinery is available. Because of this, importin α alone has a fairly low affinity for NLS sequences and a higher NLS affinity is observed when both importin α and importin β are present.

== Functions ==
The primary function of importin α is its role in the nuclear import of proteins containing a NLS sequence. Nuclear import via the Importin α pathway can be summarized by the following six step cycle:

1. The ARM repeats of free importin α in the cytoplasm bind the NLS of nucleus targeted proteins while the IBB domain simultaneously joins to an importin β protein, forming a ternary complex.
2. The ternary complex is bound at a docking site on the Nuclear Pore Complex (NPC)
3. Importin β mediates transport across the nuclear envelope
4. The ternary complex dissociates due to the binding of importin β to Ran-GTP
5. Free importin α forms an export complex along with exportin CAS and Ran-GTP and is transported out of the nucleus
6. GTP is hydrolyzed and the export complex dissociates, releasing free importin α into the cytoplasm

While this nuclear import process does make up the majority of the functional role of importin α proteins, several other important functions have been shown to be mediated by importin αs including gametogenesis, development, heat shock response, protein degradation, and viral pathogen infection.

Gametogenesis has been shown to be greatly influence by importin α proteins in multiple different ways. Animal models using Caenorhabditis elegans, Drosophila melanogaster, and higher order mammal organisms have shown that importin α is abundant in developing gametes, and mutations that cause functional alterations lead can lead to gamete defects and sterility. In bovine models, knockout of importin α encoding genes has been shown to prevent development of fertilized embryos to the blastocyst stage, thus preventing proper embryonic development and leading to death of the organism. Importin α has also been implicated in the development of heat shock response in Drosophila embryos. Additionally, Importin α import has been shown to regulated protease function, including that of Taspase1, a degrader of leukemia proteins.

Taken together, it is clear that importin α proteins are absolutely crucial to proper cellular functioning, and mutations of these proteins can have many disastrous and potentially lethal effects.

=== Role in viral pathogenicity ===
Studies have linked importin α with the recognition and import of some viral nucleoproteins, including those of the influenza A virus. It has been discovered that the Influenza A virus accesses this host machinery via a NLS like sequence toward the N-terminus of the viral nucleoprotein that can be recognized by importin α class proteins. This sequence occurs within the first 20 amino acid positions of the viral nucleoprotein and contains clusters of basic amino acids, much like those found in host NLS sequences and the importin α IBB domain. Because of this structural similarity, influenza A viral nucleoprotein is able to be imported into the nucleus of its host and take over replication machinery to proliferate. Simian Immunodeficiency Virus (SIV) is also known to take advantage of the importin α pathway via a NLS like sequence.
