= Multiple inositol-polyphosphate phosphatase =

multiple inositol-polyphosphate phosphatase

Identifiers
- EC no.: 3.1.3.62
- CAS no.: 116958-30-6

Databases
- IntEnz: IntEnz view
- BRENDA: BRENDA entry
- ExPASy: NiceZyme view
- KEGG: KEGG entry
- MetaCyc: metabolic pathway
- PRIAM: profile
- PDB structures: RCSB PDB PDBe PDBsum
- Gene Ontology: AmiGO / QuickGO
Search
- PMC: articles
- PubMed: articles
- NCBI: proteins

The enzyme multiple inositol-polyphosphate phosphatase (EC 3.1.3.62) catalyzes the reaction

myo-inositol hexakisphosphate + H_{2}O $\rightleftharpoons$ myo-inositol pentakisphosphate (mixed isomers) + phosphate

This enzyme belongs to the family of hydrolases, specifically those acting on phosphoric monoester bonds. The systematic name is 1D-myo-inositol-hexakisphosphate 5-phosphohydrolase. Other names in common use include inositol (1,3,4,5)-tetrakisphosphate 3-phosphatase, inositol 1,3,4,5-tetrakisphosphate 3-phosphomonoesterase, inositol 1,3,4,5-tetrakisphosphate-5-phosphomonoesterase, inositol tetrakisphosphate phosphomonoesterase, inositol-1,3,4,5-tetrakisphosphate 3-phosphatase, and MIPP. This enzyme participates in inositol phosphate metabolism.
