= KIAA0825 =

Protein-coding gene in the species Homo sapiens

Identifiers
- Aliases: KIAA0825, C5orf36, PAPA10
- External IDs: OMIM: 617266; MGI: 1919621; GeneCards: KIAA0825

Gene location (Human)
| Chr. | Chromosome 5 (human) |
| Band | 5q15 | Start | 94,152,966 bp |
| Band | 5q15 | End | 94,618,597 bp |

Gene location (Mouse)
| Chr. | Chromosome 13 (mouse) |
| Band | 13|13 C1 | Start | 77,283,659 bp |
| Band | 13|13 C1 | End | 77,761,903 bp |
RNA expression pattern
| Bgee | Human / Mouse (ortholog); Top expressed in: testicle; Achilles tendon; gonad; ventricular zone; bone marrow cell; right uterine tube; ganglionic eminence; monocyte; stromal cell of endometrium; prefrontal cortex / Top expressed in: spermatid; spermatocyte; embryo; tail of embryo; embryo; genital tubercle; zygote; right kidney; seminiferous tubule; ventricular zone; More reference expression data |
| BioGPS | n/a |
Orthologs
| Databases | NCBI: entry; OMA: entry |
| Species | Human | Mouse |
| Entrez | 285600 | 72371 |
| Ensembl | ENSG00000185261 | ENSMUSG00000071252 |
| UniProt | Q8IV33 | Q3UPC7 |
| RefSeq (mRNA) | NM_001145678; NM_173665 | NM_001081353; NM_001145676; NM_028215 |
| RefSeq (protein) | NP_001139150; NP_775936 | NP_001074822; NP_001139148 |
| Location (UCSC) | Chr 5: 94.15 – 94.62 Mb | Chr 13: 77.28 – 77.76 Mb |
| PubMed search |
- Wikidata
| View/Edit Human | View/Edit Mouse |

KIAA0825 is a protein that in humans is encoded by the gene of the same name, located on chromosome 5, 5q15. It is a possible risk factor in Type II Diabetes, and associated with high levels of glucose in the blood. It is a relatively fast mutating gene, compared to other coding genes. There is however one region which is highly conserved across the species that have the gene, known as DUF4495. It is predicted to travel between the nucleus and the cytoplasm.

== General information ==
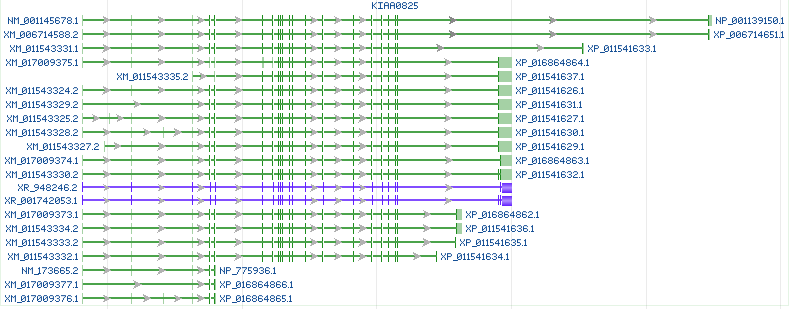
The Isoforms of C5orf36

KIAA0825 is gene that appears to be a genetic factor that increases the risk of Type II Diabetes, possibly by increasing the level of blood glucose levels. It has also been identified as a possible oncogene. C5orf36 has one common alias KIAA0825. The gene is about 478 kb long and contains 22 exons. It produces 10 different variants: 9 alternatively spliced, and one un-spliced version. The longest experimentally confirmed mRNA is 7240 bp long and produces a protein 1275 amino acids long. The protein is predicted to weigh about 147.8kDal. It has orthologs in most animals including Aplysia californica, but is not found outside animals with the possible exception of Plasmodiophora brassicae.

== Protein information ==
The protein has a predicted weight of 147.8 kDal. It does not contain a known nuclear localization signal but does contain a nuclear export signal. The subcellular localization for the protein is predicted to be the nucleus and the cytoplasm. This suggests that the protein might shuttle back and forth across the nuclear membrane.

=== Secondary structure ===
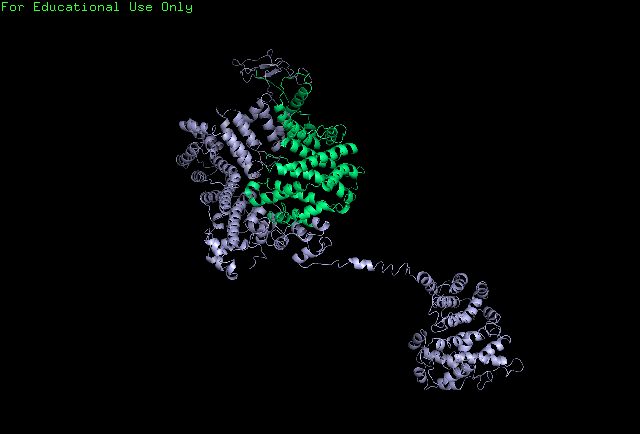
This is a 3-D Prediction created by I-TASSER. The green indicates the conserved DUF4495.

Several programs suggest that the secondary structure of the protein is mainly helices with only a few beta sheets. Analysis of protein composition also suggests that the protein has relatively low levels of glycine. This could suggest a fairly rigid structure relative to other proteins. The tertiary structure is harder to predict due to the size of the protein, partially due to its size. The 3-D structure shown shows a prediction made by I-TASSER. This is a possible structure with a C-score of -1.06 on a scale from -5 to 1 (in which the higher the number the greater the confidence). This predicted structure indicates there are two main parts, and it is possible they interact depending on the state of the protein (e.g. whether or not it's phosphorylated).

== Expression ==
mRNA expression data from the Human Protein Atlas, calculated as transcripts per million (TPM).

This shows the expression levels of C5orf36 in human tissue. It is provided by the Human Protein Atlas.

The mRNA for KIAA0825 is expressed at relatively low rates in comparison to other mRNAs. The protein however is expressed at relatively high rates, especially in parts of the brain as well as adrenal glands and the thyroid. This would suggest that the protein is not readily degraded and remains in the cell for long periods of time, such that continuous transcription of the DNA into mRNA is unnecessary. No current finding suggest that there is alternative expression of different isoforms in different tissues.

== Regulation ==
Analysis of the promoter offers some insight into the expression of KIAA0825. One possible regulator found is the NeuroD1 transcription factor. This factor is an important regulator for the insulin gene, and a mutation in this gene can lead to Type II diabetes. This could explain why KIAA0825 is expressed at lower levels in patients with Type II diabetes. Another possible transcription factor is the Myeloid zinc finger 1 factor, which is tied to myeloid leukemia, because it delays apoptosis of cells in the presence of retinoic acid. There are also several places where Vertebrate SMAD family transcription factors can bind. These transcription factors are thought to be responsible for nucleocytoplasmic dynamics. This means that these SMAD transcription factors could affect KIAA0825, because subcellular localization suggests it shuttles across the nuclear envelope.

== Function ==
There are two proteins found to interact with KIAA0825. One is Interleukin enhancer-binding factor 3. ILF3 is a factor that complexes with other proteins and regulates gene expression and stabilizes mRNAs. The other is the Amyloid-beta precursor protein. This protein is an integral membrane protein found most commonly in the synapses of neurons. Neither of these proteins is well enough understood to indicate for certain the role of C5orf36 in human cells. They however suggest that KIAA0825 could serve a variety of roles in different parts of the cell.

== Orthology ==
KIAA0825 orthologs can be found in virtually all animals, but cannot be found in plants, bacteria, or protozoa. It is mostly highly conserved in vertebrates especially mammals, but genes that contain region similar to DUF4495 region can be found in California sea hare, generally one of the most simple animal. The size especially in mammals is well conserved sticking very close to between 1250 and 1300 amino acids long. This suggests that the protein wraps around on itself forming important structures for its function.

There were no paralogs found of the gene KIAA0825 in humans or in any other species.
