= Protein tandem repeats =

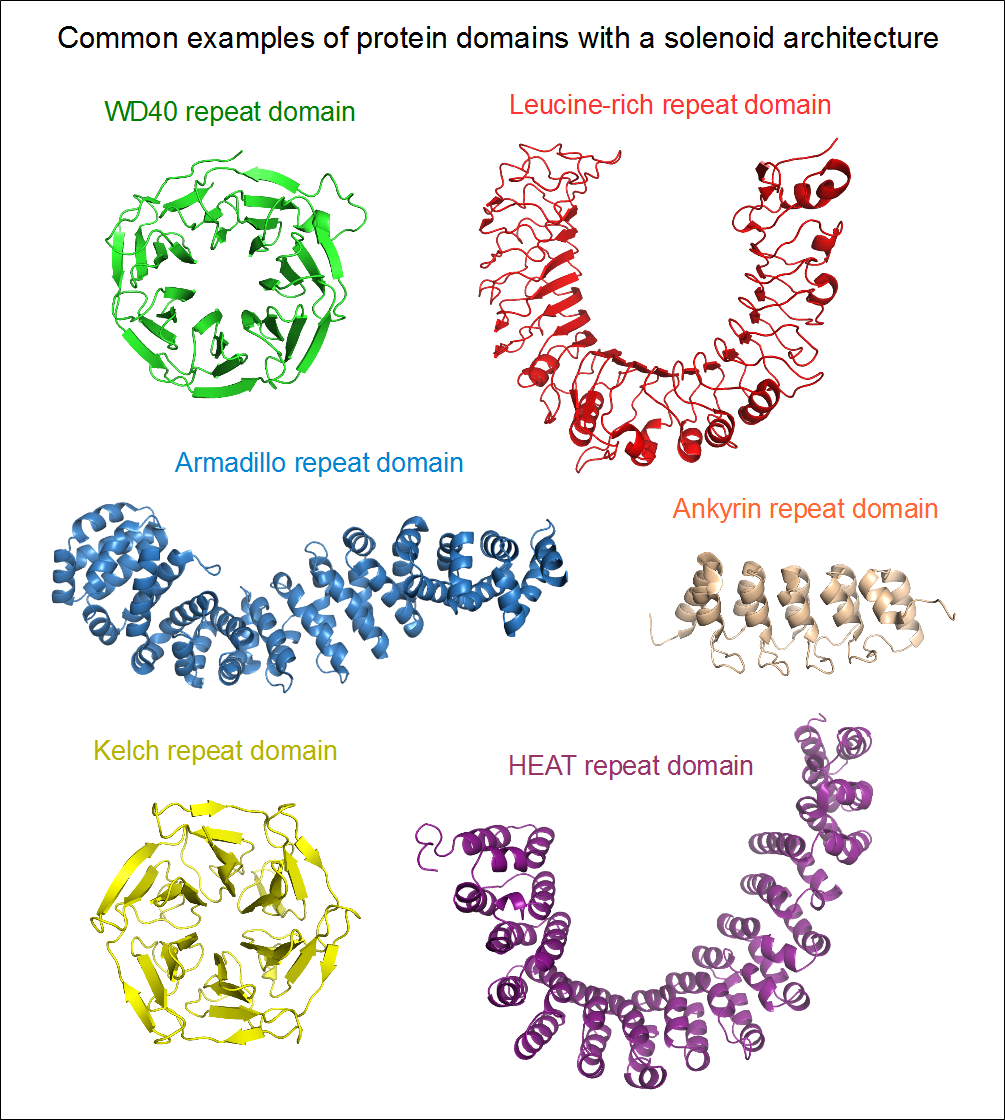
Common examples of protein tandem repeat structures: the WD40 repeat domain of beta-TrCP (green), leucine-rich repeat domain of TLR2 (red), armadillo repeat domain of beta-catenin (blue), ankyrin repeat domain of ANKRA2 (orange), kelch repeat domain of Keap1 (yellow) and HEAT repeat domain of a PP2A regulatory subunit R1a (magenta).

An array of protein tandem repeats is defined as several (at least two) adjacent copies having the same or similar sequence motifs. These periodic sequences are generated by internal duplications in both coding and non-coding genomic sequences. Repetitive units of protein tandem repeats are considerably diverse, ranging from the repetition of a single amino acid to domains of 100 or more residues.

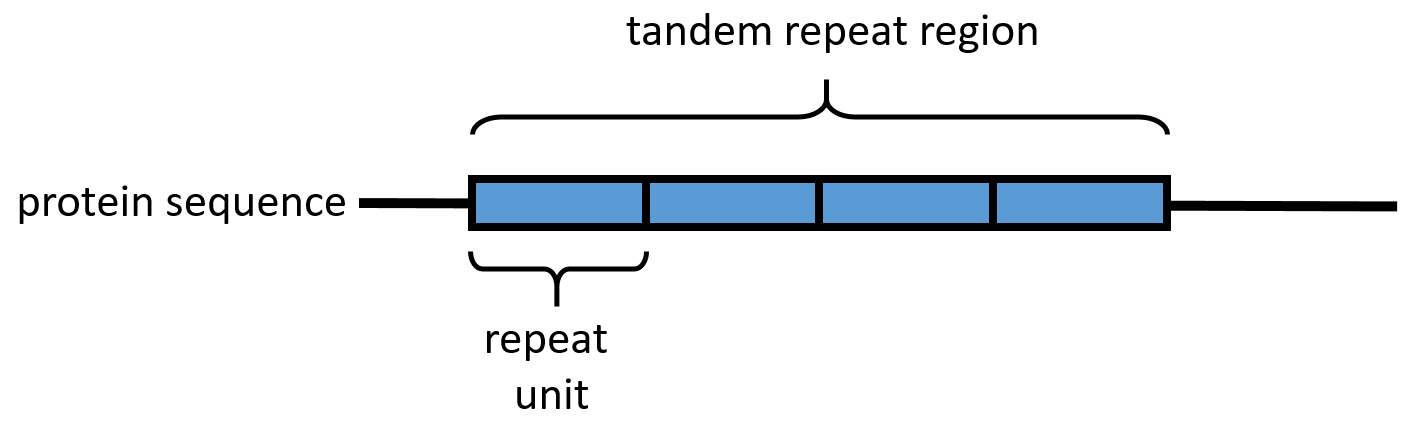
Schematic representation of tandem repeat sequence.

== "Repeats" in proteins ==
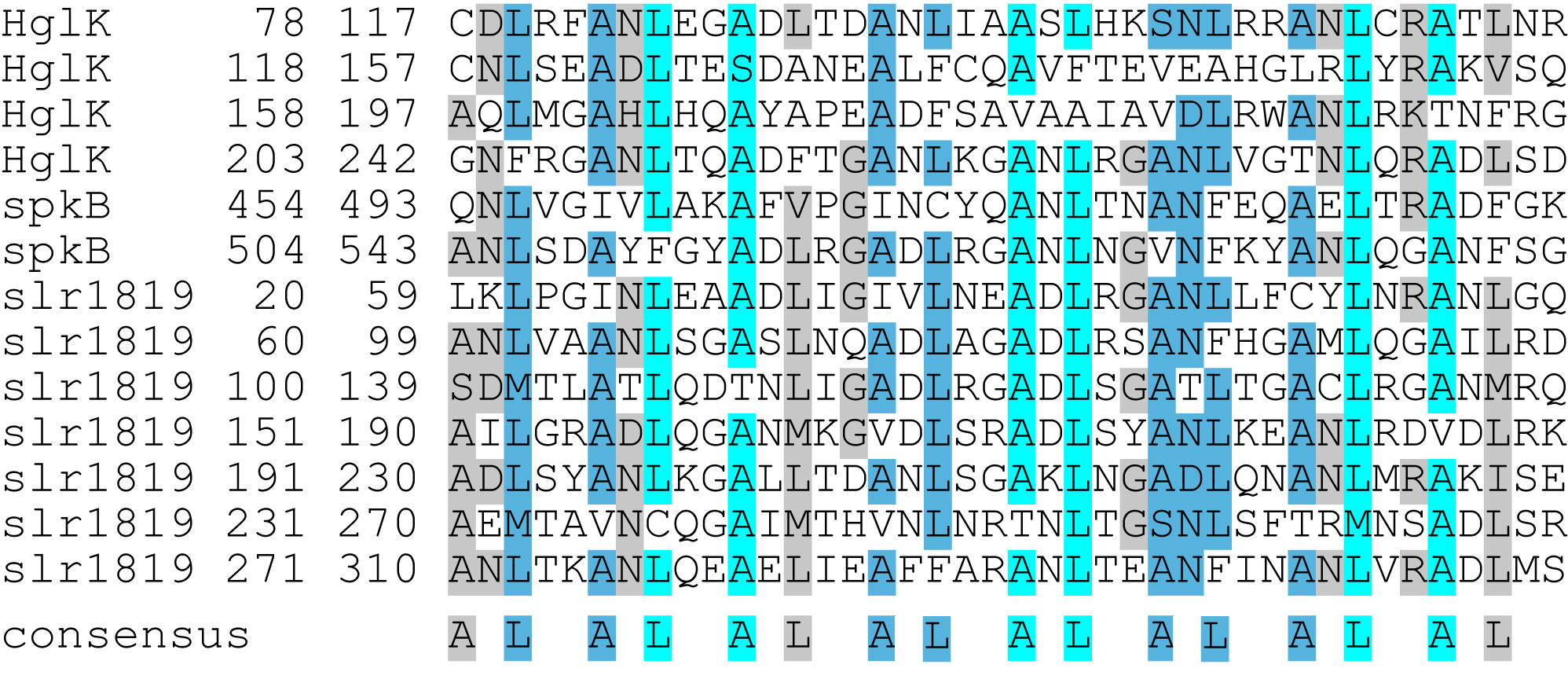
Example multiple sequence alignment of a pentapeptide repeat leading to a tandem repeat structure

In proteins, a "repeat" is any sequence block that returns more than one time in the sequence, either in an identical or a highly similar form. The degree of similarity can be highly variable, with some repeats maintaining only a few conserved amino acid positions and a characteristic length. Highly degenerate repeats can be very difficult to detect from sequence alone. Structural similarity can help to identify repetitive patterns in sequence.

== Structure ==
Repetitiveness does not in itself indicate anything about the structure of the protein. As a "rule of thumb", short repetitive sequences (e.g. those below the length of 10 amino acids) may be intrinsically disordered, and not part of any folded protein domains. Repeats that are at least 30 to 40 amino acids long are far more likely to be folded as part of a domain. Such long repeats are frequently indicative of the presence of a solenoid domain in the protein.

Approximately half of the tandem repeat regions have intrinsically disordered conformation being naturally unfolded. Examples of disordered repetitive sequences include the 7-mer peptide repeats found in the RPB1 subunit of RNA polymerase II, or the tandem beta-catenin or axin binding linear motifs in APC (adenomatous polyposis coli). The other half of the regions with the stable 3D structure has a plethora of shapes and functions. Examples of short repeats exhibiting ordered structures include the three-residue collagen repeat or the five-residue pentapeptide repeat that forms a beta helix structure.

== Classification ==
Depending on the length of the repetitive units, their protein structures can be subdivided into five classes:

1. crystalline aggregates formed by regions with 1 or 2 residue long repeats, archetypical low complexity regions
2. fibrous structures stabilized by inter-chain interactions with 3-7 residue repeats
3. elongated structures with repeats of 5–40 residues dominated by solenoid proteins
4. closed (not elongated) structures with repeats of 30-60 residues as toroid repeats
5. beads on a string structures with typical size of repeats over 50 residues, which are already large enough to fold independently into stable domains.

== Function ==
Some well-known examples of proteins with tandem repeats are collagen, which plays a key role in the arrangement of the extracellular matrix; alpha-helical coiled coils having structural and oligomerization functions; leucine-rich repeat proteins, which specifically bind some globular proteins by their concave surfaces; and zinc-finger proteins, which regulate the expression of genes by binding DNA.

Tandem repeat proteins frequently function as protein-protein interaction modules. The WD40 repeat is a prime example of this function.

== Distribution in proteomes ==
Tandem repeats are ubiquitous in proteomes and occur in at least 14% of all proteins. For example, they are present in almost every third human protein and even in every second protein from Plasmodium falciparum or Dictyostelium discoideum. Tandem repeats with short repetitive units (especially homorepeats) are more frequent than others.

== Annotation methods ==
Protein tandem repeats can be either detected from sequence or annotated from structure. Specialized methods were built for the identification of repeat proteins.

Sequence-based strategies, based on homology search or domain assignment, mostly underestimate TRs due to the presence of highly degenerate repeat units. A recent study to understand and improve Pfam coverage of the human proteome showed that five of the ten largest sequence clusters not annotated with Pfam are repeat regions. Alternatively, methods requiring no prior knowledge for the detection of repeated substrings can be based on self-comparison, clustering or hidden Markov models. Some others rely on complexity measurements or take advantage of meta searches to combine outputs from different sources.

Structure-based methods instead take advantage of the modularity of available PDB structures to recognize repetitive elements.
