= Pentapeptide repeat =

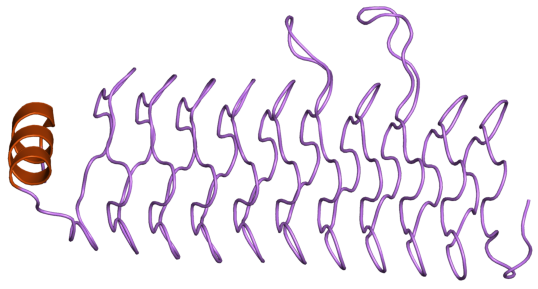
- Structure of the pentapeptide repeat protein HetL.

Identifiers
- Symbol: Pentapeptide
- Pfam: PF00805
- InterPro: IPR001646
Available protein structures:
- PDB: 2bm4, 2bm5, 2bm6, 2bm7, 2w7z, 3du1, PDB: 2O6W, PDB: 2J8K, PDB: 2J8I IPR001646 PF00805 (ECOD; PDBsum)
- AlphaFold: IPR001646; PF00805

Pentapeptide repeats are a family of sequence motifs found in multiple tandem copies in protein molecules. Pentapeptide repeat proteins are found in all species, but they are found in many copies in cyanobacterial genomes. The repeats were first identified by Black and colleagues in the hglK protein. The later Bateman et al. showed that a large family of related pentapeptide repeat proteins existed. The function of these repeats is uncertain in most proteins. However, in the MfpA protein a DNA gyrase inhibitor it has been suggested that the pentapeptide repeat structure mimics the structure of DNA. The repeats form a regular right handed four sided beta helix structure known as the Rfr-fold.

== Sequence features ==
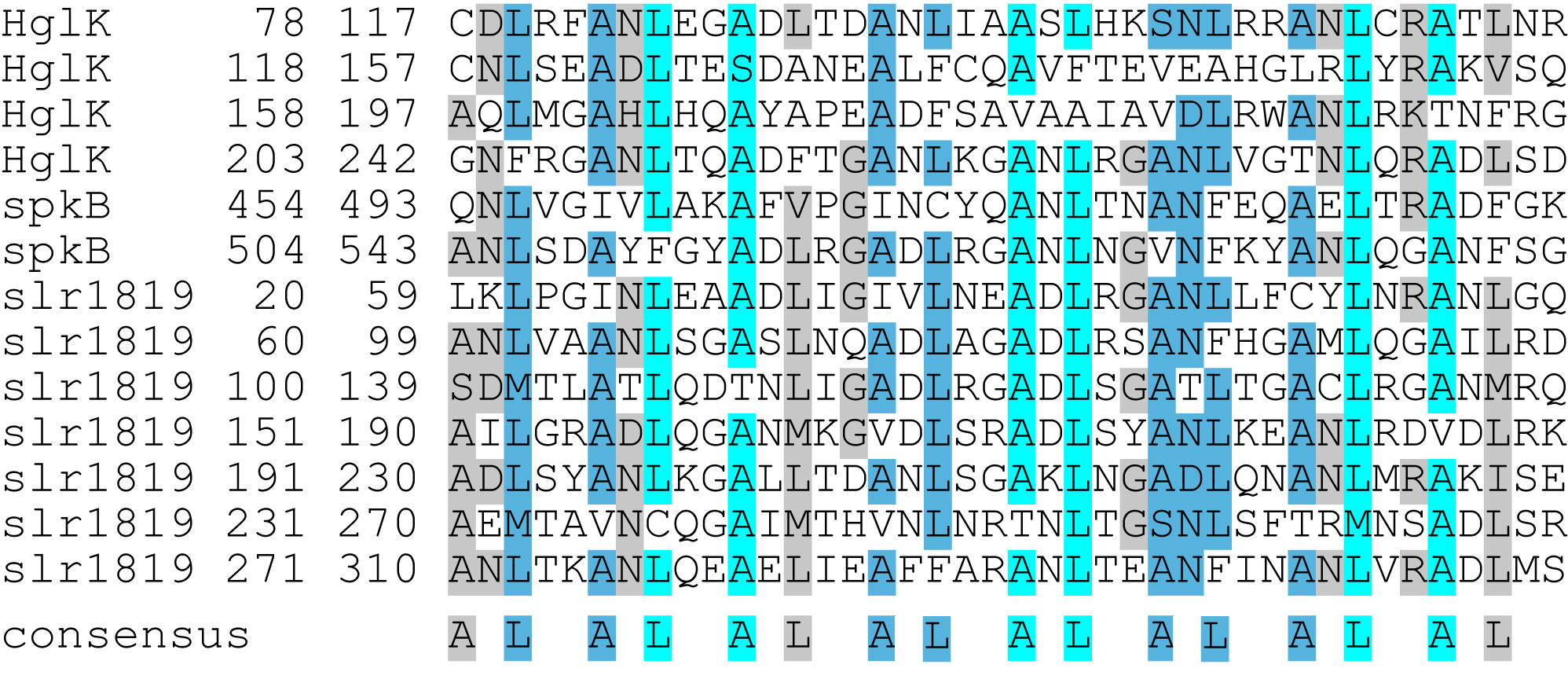
Multiple sequence alignment of pentapeptide repeat proteins.

Dot plot of the HglK protein against itself showing repeats as diagonal lines.

The pentapeptide repeat is a feature seen in protein sequence. It can be approximately described using the 1-letter amino acid code as A(D/N)LXX, where X can be any amino acid. This repeating sequence can be seen in multiple sequence alignments and dot plots of proteins such as HglK. The central position in the pentapeptide repeat is usually a leucine and has been designated as position i. The two previous positions are known as i-1 and i-2. Position i-2 is usually an alanine. The two subsequent positions are denoted i+1 and i+2. The side chains of positions i-2 and i point into the hydrophobic interior of the protein while the side chains of positions i-1, i+1 and i+2 are exposed on the surface of the proteins.

== Structure ==
Pentapeptide repeats were initially predicted from sequence to possess a right handed beta helix with three sides. The first crystal structure of a pentapeptide repeat protein was the MfpA protein solved by Hegde and colleagues. It showed that pentapeptide repeat proteins (PRPs) possessed a four sided beta helix structure. Four repeats make up one turn of a solenoid like structure. The structures of eight different proteins have been solved to date.

Protein	PDB code	Length	Number of repeats	Reference
Mycobacterium tuberculosis MfpA	PDB: 2bm4	183	30	
Cyanobacterium nostoc HetL	PDB: 3du1	237	40	
Enterococcus faecalis EfsQnr	PDB: 2w7z	211		
Nostoc punctiforme Np275	PDB: 2J8I	98	17	
Nostoc punctiforme Np276	PDB: 2J8K	75	12	
Cyanothece sp. Rfr32	PDB: 2F3L PDB: 2G0Y	167	21	
Cyanothece sp. Rfr23	PDB: 2O6W	174	23	
Arabidopsis thaliana At2g44920	PDB: 3N90	224	25	
