= Chromosome 4 =

Human chromosome

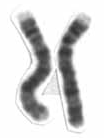
- Human chromosome 4 pair after G-banding. One is from mother, one is from father.

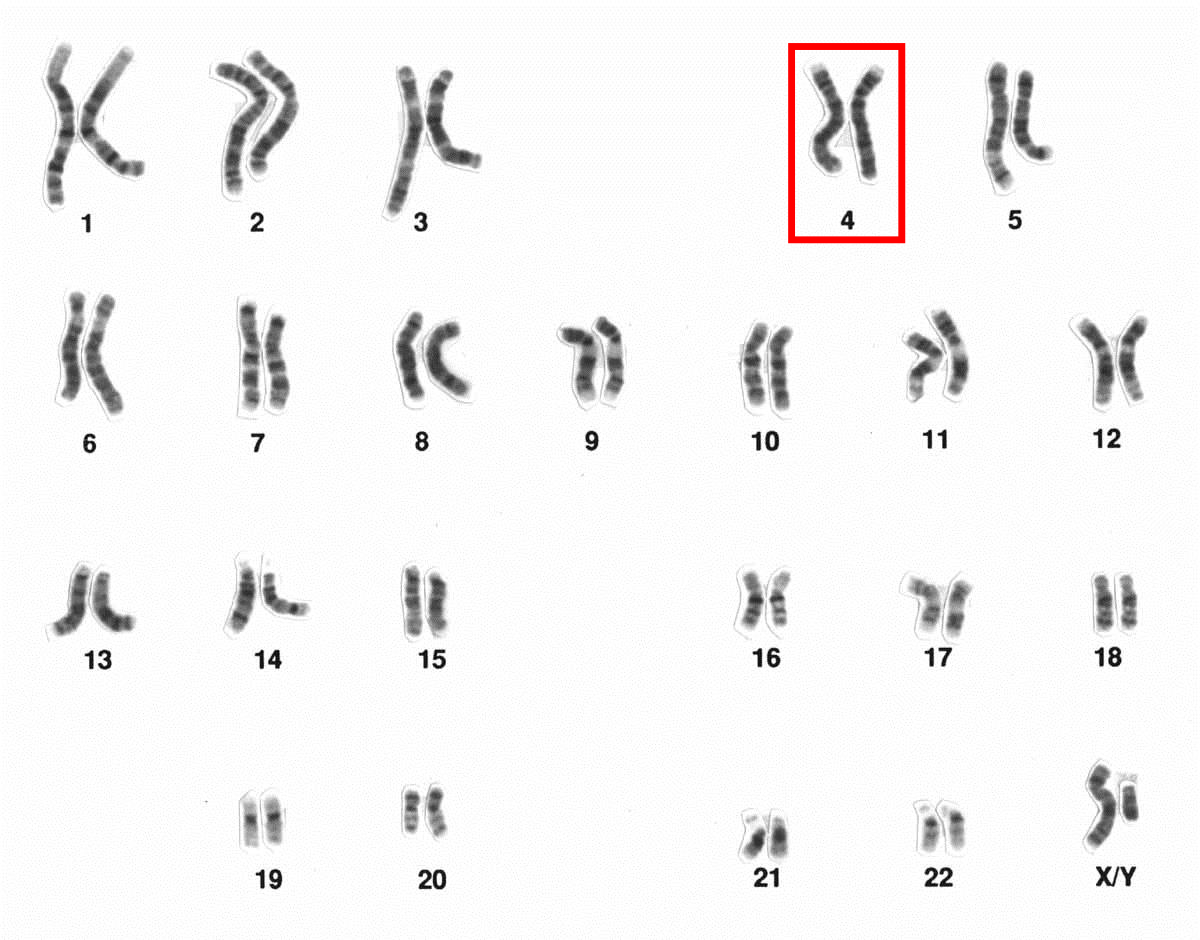
- Chromosome 4 pair in human male karyogram.

Features
- Length (bp): 193,574,945 bp (CHM13)
- No. of genes: 727 (CCDS)
- Type: Autosome
- Centromere position: Submetacentric (50.0 Mbp)

Complete gene lists
- CCDS: Gene list
- HGNC: Gene list
- UniProt: Gene list
- NCBI: Gene list

External map viewers
- Ensembl: Chromosome 4
- Entrez: Chromosome 4
- NCBI: Chromosome 4
- UCSC: Chromosome 4

Full DNA sequences
- RefSeq: NC_000004 (FASTA)
- GenBank: CM000666 (FASTA)

Chromosome 4 is one of the 23 pairs of chromosomes in humans. People normally have two copies of this chromosome. Chromosome 4 spans more than 190 million base pairs (the building material of DNA) and represents between 6 and 6.5 percent of the total DNA in cells.

== Genomics ==
The chromosome is ~193 megabases in length. In a 2012 paper, 775 protein-encoding genes were identified on this chromosome. 211 (27.9%) of these coding sequences did not have any experimental evidence at the protein level, in 2012. 271 appear to be membrane proteins. 54 have been classified as cancer-associated proteins.

== Genes ==
=== Number of genes ===
The following are some of the gene count estimates of human chromosome 4. Because researchers use different approaches to genome annotation their predictions of the number of genes on each chromosome varies (for technical details, see gene prediction). Among various projects, the collaborative consensus coding sequence project (CCDS) takes an extremely conservative strategy. So CCDS's gene number prediction represents a lower bound on the total number of human protein-coding genes.

Estimated by	Protein-coding genes	Non-coding RNA genes	Pseudogenes	Source	Release date
CCDS	727	—	—		2016-09-08
HGNC	731	277	633		2017-05-12
Ensembl	746	993	727		2017-03-29
UniProt	765	—	—		2018-02-28
NCBI	769	934	819		2017-05-19

=== Gene list ===
The following is a partial list of genes on human chromosome 4. For complete list, see the link in the infobox on the right.

- AASDH: aminoadipate-semialdehyde dehydrogenase
- ACVR1: activin-like kinase 2 (ALK-2)
- ACOX3: encoding enzyme Peroxisomal acyl-coenzyme A oxidase 3
- AFAP1-AS1: encoding protein AFAP1 antisense RNA 1
- AGA: AGU syndrome (Finnish heritage disease) related gene
- AGPAT9: encoding enzyme Glycerol-3-phosphate acyltransferase 3 a.k.a. 1-acylglycerol-3-phosphate O-acyltransferase 9
- ANK2: ankyrin 2, neuronal
- APBB2: encoding protein Amyloid beta A4 precursor protein-binding family B member 2
- ART3: encoding enzyme Ecto-ADP-ribosyltransferase 3
- ASAHL: encoding enzyme N-acylethanolamine-hydrolyzing acid amidase
- BANK1: encoding protein B cell scaffold protein with ankyrin repeats 1
- BEND4: encoding protein BEN domain containing 4
- CCDC109B: Coiled-coil domain containing 109B
- CLNK: encoding protein Cytokine dependent hematopoietic cell linker
- Complement Factor I: Complement Factor I
- COL25A1-DT: encoding protein Zinc finger, cchc domain containing 23
- CRMP1: Collapsin response mediator protein 1, a member of CRMP family
- CSN2: Beta-casein
- CXCL1: chemokine (C-X-C motif) ligand 1, scyb1
- CXCL2: chemokine (C-X-C motif) ligand 2, scyb2
- CXCL3: chemokine (C-X-C motif) ligand 3, scyb3
- CXCL4: chemokine (C-X-C motif) ligand 4, Platelet factor-4, PF-4, scyb4
- CXCL5: chemokine (C-X-C motif) ligand 5, scyb5
- CXCL6: chemokine (C-X-C motif) ligand 6, scyb6
- CXCL7: chemokine (C-X-C motif) ligand 7, PPBP, scyb7
- CXCL8: chemokine (C-X-C motif) ligand 8, interleukin 8 (IL-8), scyb8
- CXCL9: chemokine (C-X-C motif) ligand 9, scyb9
- CXCL10: chemokine (C-X-C motif) ligand 10, scyb10
- CXCL11: chemokine (C-X-C motif) ligand 11, scyb11
- CXCL13: chemokine (C-X-C motif) ligand 13, scyb13
- CYTL1: Cytokine-like 1
- DCUN1D4: Defective in cullin neddylation 1 domain containing 4
- DHX15: DEAH-box helicase 15
- DKK2: Dickkopf-related protein 2
- DMAC1: encoding protein Transmembrane protein 261
- DUX4: Thought to be inactive but 2010 research shows a key role in FSHD
- ELMOD2: Elmo domain-containing 2
- EMCN: Endomucin
- EVC: Ellis–Van Creveld syndrome
- EVC2: Ellis–Van Creveld syndrome 2 (limbin)
- Factor XI: Mutations cause Haemophilia C
- FAM114A1: Family with sequence similarity 114, member A1
- FAM149A: Family with sequence similarity 149, member A
- FAM193A: Family with sequence similarity 193, member A
- FAM198B: encoding protein Protein ENED
- FAM221B: Family with sequence similarity 221, member B
- FAM47E-STBD1: FAM47E-STBD1 readthrough
- FGF2: Fibroblast growth factor 2 (basic fibroblast growth factor)
- FGFR3: fibroblast growth factor receptor 3 (achondroplasia, thanatophoric dwarfism, bladder cancer)
- FGFRL1: fibroblast growth factor receptor-like 1
- FRG1: FSHD region gene 1
- FRYL: encoding protein FRY like transcription coactivator
- FSTL5: encoding protein Follistatin like 5
- GUF1: GUF1 homolog, GTPase
- HDL3: encoding Huntington-like neurodegenerative disorder 2 protein
- HELQ: encoding protein Helicase, POLQ-like
- HTT (Huntingtin): huntingtin protein (Huntington's disease)
- IGJ: linker protein for immunoglobulin alpha and mu polypeptides
- INTS12: Integrator complex subunit 12
- KDR: Kinase insert domain receptor (Vascular endothelial growth factor receptor 2)
- KIAA1530: UV stimulated scaffold protein A
- KIT: tyrosine-protein kinase KIT, CD117; mast/stem cell growth factor receptor (SCFR)
- LCORL: Ligand dependent nuclear receptor corepressor like
- LDB2: LIM domain-binding protein 2
- LGI2: Leucine-rich repeat LGI family member 2
- LOC100505912 encoding protein Uncharacterized LOC100505912
- LSM6: U6 snRNA-associated Sm-like protein
- LTO1P1: encoding protein Oral cancer overexpressed 1 pseudogene 1
- LYAR: Cell growth-regulating nucleolar protein
- MAB21L2: Mab-21-like 2
- Marcksl1: encoding protein MARCKS-like 1
- MAML3: Mastermind-like 3
- MFSD7: encoding protein Major facilitator superfamily domain containing 7
- MIR1269A: microRNA 1269a
- MIR95: non-coding RNA MicroRNA 95
- MLF1IP: Centromere protein U
- MMAA: methylmalonic aciduria (cobalamin deficiency) cblA type
- MTHFD2L: NAD-dependent methylenetetrahydrofolate dehydrogenase 2-like protein
- MYL5: Myosin light chain 5
- NAP1L5: encoding protein Nucleosome assembly protein 1 like 5
- NDNF: encoding protein Neuron derived neurotrophic factor
- NOA1: encoding protein Nitric oxide associated 1
- NPNT: encoding protein Nephronectin
- NUDT6: nudix hydrolase 6
- NUDT9: nudix hydrolase 9
- OTUD4: OTU domain-containing protein 4
- PABPC4L: encoding protein Poly(A) binding protein, cytoplasmic 4-like
- PARM1: Prostate androgen-regulated mucin-like protein 1
- PHOX2B: codes for a homeodomain transcription factor
- PI4K2B: Phosphatidylinositol 4-kinase type 2-beta
- PKD2: polycystic kidney disease 2 (autosomal dominant)
- PLAC8: encoding protein Placenta specific 8
- PLK4: Serine/threonine-protein kinase PLK4
- PPEF2: encoding protein Protein phosphatase with ef-hand domain 2
- PSAPL1: encoding protein Prosaposin-like 1 (gene/pseudogene)
- QDPR: quinoid dihydropteridine reductase
- RBM47: RNA binding motif protein 47
- RG9MTD2: encoding protein RNA (guanine-9-) methyltransferase domain containing 2
- SCRG1: encoding protein Stimulator of chondrogenesis 1
- SDAD1: protein SDA1 homolog
- SEC24B: Sec24 homolog B
- SEC24D: Sec24 homolog D
- SEPT11: Septin-11
- SLC9B2: solute carrier family 9 member B2
- SLC10A4: solute carrier family 10 member 4
- SMIM20: encoding protein Small integral membrane protein 20
- SNCA: synuclein, alpha (non A4 component of amyloid precursor)
- SPATA5: Spermatogenesis-associated protein 5
- STATH: gene with protein product
- TACC3: Transforming acidic coiled-coil-containing protein 3
- TENM3: Teneurin transmembrane protein 3
- THAP6: THAP domain-containing protein 6
- TMEM155: encoding protein Transmembrane protein 155
- TMEM165: encoding protein Transmembrane protein 165
- TMEM175: encoding protein Transmembrane protein 175
- TMEM243: encoding protein Transmembrane protein 243
- TMPRSS11D: Transmembrane protease, serine 11D
- TMPRSS11F: encoding protein Transmembrane serine protease 11F
- TNIP2: TNFAIP3-interaction protein 2
- TNIP3: encoding protein TNFAIP3 interacting protein 3
- UCHL1: ubiquitin carboxyl-terminal esterase L1 (ubiquitin thiolesterase)
- UGDH-AS1: encoding protein UGDH antisense RNA 1
- UGT8: UDP glycosyltransferase 8
- UNC5C: netrin receptor UNC5C
- UPF0602: encoding UPF0602 Protein C4orf47
- USP38: encoding protein Ubiquitin specific peptidase 38
- USP53: ubiquitin specific peptidase 53
- UTP3: small subunit processome component
- VPS54
- WFS1: Wolfram syndrome 1 (wolframin)
- ZGRF1: zinc-finger GRF-type containing 1
- ZNF621: encoding protein Zinc finger protein 621

== Diseases and disorders ==
The following are some of the diseases related to genes located on chromosome 4:

- Achondroplasia
- Autosomal dominant polycystic kidney disease (PKD-2)
- Bladder cancer
- Crouzonodermoskeletal syndrome
- Chronic lymphocytic leukemia
- Congenital central hypoventilation syndrome
- Ellis–Van Creveld syndrome
- Facioscapulohumeral muscular dystrophy
- Fibrodysplasia ossificans progressiva (FOP)
- Haemophilia C
- Huntington's disease
- Hemolytic uremic syndrome
- Hereditary benign intraepithelial dyskeratosis
- Hirschprung's disease
- Hypochondroplasia
- Mast cell activation syndrome
- Methylmalonic acidemia
- Mucopolysaccharidosis type I
- Muenke syndrome
- Nonsyndromic deafness
- Nonsyndromic deafness, autosomal dominant
- Parkinson's disease
- Polycystic kidney disease
- Romano–Ward syndrome
- SADDAN
- Tetrahydrobiopterin deficiency
- Thanatophoric dysplasia
  - Type 1
  - Type 2
- Wolfram syndrome
- Wolf–Hirschhorn syndrome

== Cytogenetic band ==
G-banding ideograms of human chromosome 4

G-banding ideogram of human chromosome 4 in resolution 850 bphs. Band length in this diagram is proportional to base-pair length. This type of ideogram is generally used in genome browsers (e.g. Ensembl, UCSC Genome Browser).

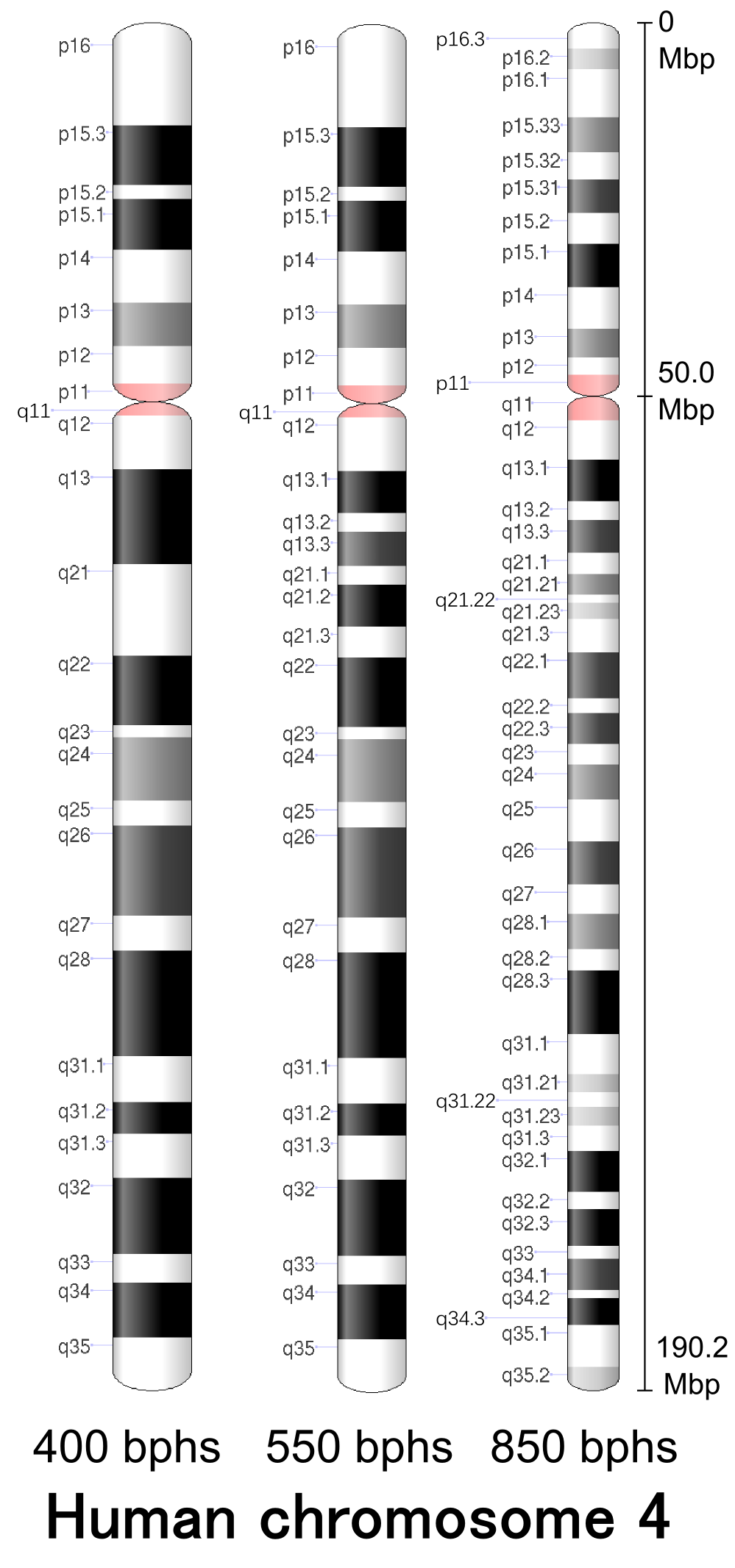
G-banding patterns of human chromosome 4 in three different resolutions (400, 550 and 850). Band length in this diagram is based on the ideograms from ISCN (2013). This type of ideogram represents actual relative band length observed under a microscope at the different moments during the mitotic process.

G-bands of human chromosome 4 in resolution 850 bphs
Chr.	Arm	Band	ISCN start	ISCN stop	Basepair start	Basepair stop	Stain	Density
4	p	16.3	0	220	1	4,500,000	gneg	
4	p	16.2	220	389	4,500,001	6,000,000	gpos	25
4	p	16.1	389	779	6,000,001	11,300,000	gneg	
4	p	15.33	779	1066	11,300,001	15,000,000	gpos	50
4	p	15.32	1066	1286	15,000,001	17,700,000	gneg	
4	p	15.31	1286	1557	17,700,001	21,300,000	gpos	75
4	p	15.2	1557	1811	21,300,001	27,700,000	gneg	
4	p	15.1	1811	2166	27,700,001	35,800,000	gpos	100
4	p	14	2166	2505	35,800,001	41,200,000	gneg	
4	p	13	2505	2742	41,200,001	44,600,000	gpos	50
4	p	12	2742	2877	44,600,001	48,200,000	gneg	
4	p	11	2877	3046	48,200,001	50,000,000	acen	
4	q	11	3046	3249	50,000,001	51,800,000	acen	
4	q	12	3249	3571	51,800,001	58,500,000	gneg	
4	q	13.1	3571	3910	58,500,001	65,500,000	gpos	100
4	q	13.2	3910	4062	65,500,001	69,400,000	gneg	
4	q	13.3	4062	4333	69,400,001	75,300,000	gpos	75
4	q	21.1	4333	4502	75,300,001	78,000,000	gneg	
4	q	21.21	4502	4671	78,000,001	81,500,000	gpos	50
4	q	21.22	4671	4739	81,500,001	83,200,000	gneg	
4	q	21.23	4739	4874	83,200,001	86,000,000	gpos	25
4	q	21.3	4874	5145	86,000,001	87,100,000	gneg	
4	q	22.1	5145	5517	87,100,001	92,800,000	gpos	75
4	q	22.2	5517	5636	92,800,001	94,200,000	gneg	
4	q	22.3	5636	5890	94,200,001	97,900,000	gpos	75
4	q	23	5890	6059	97,900,001	100,100,000	gneg	
4	q	24	6059	6347	100,100,001	106,700,000	gpos	50
4	q	25	6347	6685	106,700,001	113,200,000	gneg	
4	q	26	6685	7040	113,200,001	119,900,000	gpos	75
4	q	27	7040	7277	119,900,001	122,800,000	gneg	
4	q	28.1	7277	7565	122,800,001	127,900,000	gpos	50
4	q	28.2	7565	7734	127,900,001	130,100,000	gneg	
4	q	28.3	7734	8259	130,100,001	138,500,000	gpos	100
4	q	31.1	8259	8581	138,500,001	140,600,000	gneg	
4	q	31.21	8581	8733	140,600,001	145,900,000	gpos	25
4	q	31.22	8733	8851	145,900,001	147,500,000	gneg	
4	q	31.23	8851	9004	147,500,001	150,200,000	gpos	25
4	q	31.3	9004	9207	150,200,001	154,600,000	gneg	
4	q	32.1	9207	9545	154,600,001	160,800,000	gpos	100
4	q	32.2	9545	9681	160,800,001	163,600,000	gneg	
4	q	32.3	9681	9985	163,600,001	169,200,000	gpos	100
4	q	33	9985	10087	169,200,001	171,000,000	gneg	
4	q	34.1	10087	10341	171,000,001	175,400,000	gpos	75
4	q	34.2	10341	10408	175,400,001	176,600,000	gneg	
4	q	34.3	10408	10628	176,600,001	182,300,000	gpos	100
4	q	35.1	10628	10967	182,300,001	186,200,000	gneg	
4	q	35.2	10967	11170	186,200,001	190,214,555	gpos	25
