= Mastermind-like protein 3 =

Protein found in humans

MAML3

Identifiers
- Aliases: MAML3, CAGH3, ERDA3, GDN, MAM-2, MAM2, TNRC3, Mastermind-like 3, mastermind like transcriptional coactivator 3, mam-3
- External IDs: OMIM: 608991; MGI: 2389461; GeneCards: MAML3

Gene location (Human)
Chr.	Chromosome 4 (human)
Band	4q31.1	Start	139,716,753 bp
Band	4q31.1	End	140,154,184 bp

Gene location (Mouse)
Chr.	Chromosome 3 (mouse)
Band	3|3 C	Start	51,593,328 bp
Band	3|3 C	End	52,012,497 bp
RNA expression pattern
Bgee	Human / Mouse (ortholog); Top expressed in: germinal epithelium; corpus epididymis; gingival epithelium; skin of hip; tail of epididymis; parotid gland; visceral pleura; sural nerve; parietal pleura; caput epididymis / Top expressed in: paraxial mesoderm; tail of embryo; ureter; genital tubercle; female urethra; placenta; male urethra; stroma of kidney; ventricular zone; lip; More reference expression data
BioGPS	n/a
Gene ontology
Molecular function	transcription coactivator activity
Cellular component	nucleus; nucleoplasm; nuclear speck
Biological process	Notch signaling pathway; transcription initiation from RNA polymerase II promoter; regulation of transcription, DNA-templated; transcription, DNA-templated; positive regulation of transcription by RNA polymerase II; positive regulation of transcription of Notch receptor target; positive regulation of Notch signaling pathway
Sources:Amigo / QuickGO
Orthologs
Databases	NCBI: entry; OMA: entry
Species	Human	Mouse
Entrez	55534	433586
Ensembl	ENSG00000196782	ENSMUSG00000061143
UniProt	Q96JK9	n/a
RefSeq (mRNA)	NM_018717	NM_001004176
RefSeq (protein)	NP_061187	n/a
Location (UCSC)	Chr 4: 139.72 – 140.15 Mb	Chr 3: 51.59 – 52.01 Mb
PubMed search
- Wikidata
View/Edit Human	View/Edit Mouse

Mastermind-like protein 3 is a protein that in humans is encoded by the MAML3 gene. This protein functions as a transcriptional coactivator for notch proteins.
