= ELMO domain containing 2 =

Protein-coding gene in the species Homo sapiens

ELMOD2

Identifiers
- Aliases: ELMOD2, 9830169G11Rik, ELMO domain containing 2
- External IDs: OMIM: 610196; MGI: 2445165; GeneCards: ELMOD2

Gene location (Human)
Chr.	Chromosome 4 (human)
Band	4q31.1	Start	140,524,168 bp
Band	4q31.1	End	140,553,770 bp

Gene location (Mouse)
Chr.	Chromosome 8 (mouse)
Band	8|8 C2	Start	84,039,261 bp
Band	8|8 C2	End	84,059,115 bp
RNA expression pattern
Bgee	Human / Mouse (ortholog); Top expressed in: Achilles tendon; mucosa of ileum; renal medulla; lateral nuclear group of thalamus; spinal ganglia; cardia; trigeminal ganglion; mucosa of paranasal sinus; jejunal mucosa; nasal epithelium / Top expressed in: primary oocyte; otic vesicle; secondary oocyte; zygote; otolith organ; utricle; Epithelium of choroid plexus; hand; retinal pigment epithelium; medullary collecting duct; More reference expression data
BioGPS	n/a
Gene ontology
Molecular function	GTPase activator activity
Cellular component	membrane
Biological process	defense response to virus; regulation of defense response to virus; positive regulation of GTPase activity
Sources:Amigo / QuickGO
Orthologs
Databases	NCBI: entry; OMA: entry
Species	Human	Mouse
Entrez	255520	244548
Ensembl	ENSG00000179387	ENSMUSG00000035151
UniProt	Q8IZ81	Q8BGF6
RefSeq (mRNA)	NM_153702	NM_001170691; NM_178736
RefSeq (protein)	NP_714913	NP_001164162; NP_848851
Location (UCSC)	Chr 4: 140.52 – 140.55 Mb	Chr 8: 84.04 – 84.06 Mb
PubMed search
- Wikidata
View/Edit Human	View/Edit Mouse

ELMO domain containing 2 is a protein that in humans is encoded by the ELMOD2 gene.

== Function ==
This gene encodes one of six engulfment and motility (ELMO) domain-containing proteins. This gene is thought to play a role in antiviral responses. Mutations in this gene may be involved in the cause of familial idiopathic pulmonary fibrosis.
