= TMPRSS11F =

Protein-coding gene in the species Homo sapiens

Identifiers
- Aliases: TMPRSS11F, transmembrane protease, serine 11F, transmembrane serine protease 11F, HATL4
- External IDs: MGI: 2442348; GeneCards: TMPRSS11F

Gene location (Human)
Chr.	Chromosome 4 (human)
Band	4q13.2	Start	68,053,198 bp
Band	4q13.2	End	68,129,869 bp

Gene location (Mouse)
Chr.	Chromosome 5 (mouse)
Band	5|5 E1	Start	86,669,757 bp
Band	5|5 E1	End	86,780,283 bp
RNA expression pattern
Bgee	Human / Mouse (ortholog); Top expressed in: testicle; skin of leg; skin of abdomen; vagina; tonsil; placenta; ectocervix; gonad; skeletal muscle tissue; minor salivary glands / Top expressed in: esophagus; lip; skin of abdomen; conjunctival fornix; skin of back; skin of external ear; cornea; hair follicle; spermatid; stomach; More reference expression data
BioGPS	n/a
Gene ontology
Molecular function	peptidase activity; serine-type peptidase activity; hydrolase activity; serine-type endopeptidase activity
Cellular component	integral component of membrane; extracellular region; integral component of plasma membrane; membrane
Biological process	proteolysis
Sources:Amigo / QuickGO
Orthologs
Databases	NCBI: entry; OMA: entry
Species	Human	Mouse
Entrez	389208	243083
Ensembl	ENSG00000198092	ENSMUSG00000048764
UniProt	Q6ZWK6	Q8BHM9
RefSeq (mRNA)	NM_207407	NM_178730
RefSeq (protein)	NP_997290	NP_848845
Location (UCSC)	Chr 4: 68.05 – 68.13 Mb	Chr 5: 86.67 – 86.78 Mb
PubMed search
- Wikidata
View/Edit Human	View/Edit Mouse

Transmembrane serine protease 11F is a protein that is encoded by the TMPRSS11F gene in humans.
