= Neuron derived neurotrophic factor =

Protein-coding gene in the species Homo sapiens

NDNF

Identifiers
- Aliases: NDNF, C4orf31, NORD, neuron-derived neurotrophic factor, neuron derived neurotrophic factor, HH25
- External IDs: OMIM: 616506; MGI: 1915419; HomoloGene: 11593; GeneCards: NDNF; OMA:NDNF - orthologs

Gene location (Human)
Chr.	Chromosome 4 (human)
Band	4q27	Start	121,035,613 bp
Band	4q27	End	121,073,021 bp

Gene location (Mouse)
Chr.	Chromosome 6 (mouse)
Band	6|6 C1	Start	65,648,574 bp
Band	6|6 C1	End	65,689,310 bp
RNA expression pattern
Bgee	Human / Mouse (ortholog); Top expressed in: glomerulus; metanephric glomerulus; visceral pleura; lower lobe of lung; periodontal fiber; Epithelium of choroid plexus; right lung; bronchial epithelial cell; tibia; upper lobe of lung / Top expressed in: calvaria; left lung lobe; right lung; right lung lobe; renal corpuscle; iris; neural layer of retina; otolith organ; maxillary prominence; utricle; More reference expression data
BioGPS	n/a
Gene ontology
Molecular function	glycosaminoglycan binding; heparin binding
Cellular component	extracellular matrix; intracellular anatomical structure; extracellular region
Biological process	negative regulation of neuron apoptotic process; negative regulation of endothelial cell apoptotic process; response to ischemia; neuron migration; cellular response to hypoxia; angiogenesis; nervous system development; nitric oxide mediated signal transduction; positive regulation of neuron projection development; positive regulation of cell-substrate adhesion; peptide cross-linking via chondroitin 4-sulfate glycosaminoglycan; extracellular matrix organization; vascular wound healing
Sources:Amigo / QuickGO
Orthologs
Species	Human	Mouse
Entrez	79625	68169
Ensembl	ENSG00000173376	ENSMUSG00000049001
UniProt	Q8TB73	Q8C119
RefSeq (mRNA)	NM_024574	NM_172399
RefSeq (protein)	NP_078850	NP_765987
Location (UCSC)	Chr 4: 121.04 – 121.07 Mb	Chr 6: 65.65 – 65.69 Mb
PubMed search
- Wikidata
View/Edit Human	View/Edit Mouse

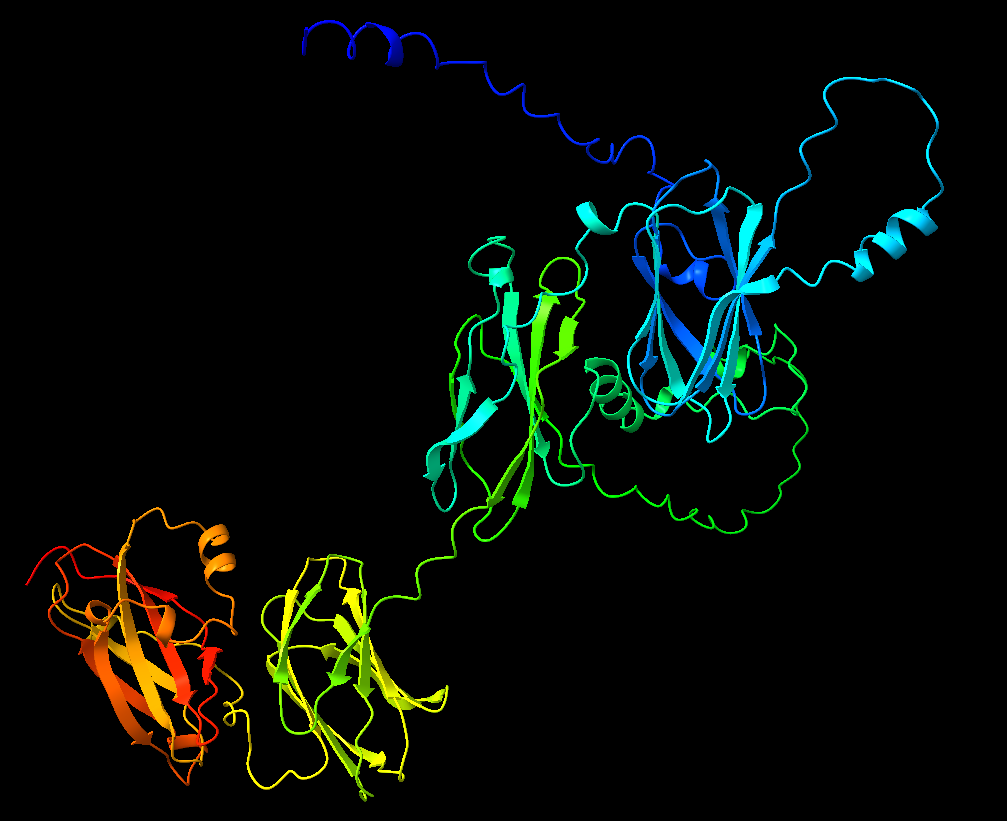
3D protein structure of the NDNF gene as based on an Alphafold model.

Neuron derived neurotrophic factor is a secreted protein that, in humans, is encoded by the NDNF gene, located on chromosome 4. This protein helps in the growth, survival, migration, and differentiation of neurons. To assist with migration, NDNF shows neuro-repulsive effects on GnRH neurons. Loss of function (LoF) in the NDNF gene has been shown to be a cause of a disease known as congenital hypogonadotropic hypogonadism, which can have associated cleft lip and cleft palate. A preliminary study has shown that knock-down of ndnf reduces development of the ethmoid plate, which is homologous to the human palate.
