= NOA1 =

Protein-coding gene in the species Homo sapiens

Identifiers
- Aliases: NOA1, C4orf14, MTG3, hAtNOS1, hmAtNOS1, nitric oxide associated 1
- External IDs: OMIM: 614919; MGI: 1914306; HomoloGene: 10518; GeneCards: NOA1; OMA:NOA1 - orthologs

Gene location (Human)
Chr.	Chromosome 4 (human)
Band	4q12	Start	56,963,350 bp
Band	4q12	End	56,977,606 bp

Gene location (Mouse)
Chr.	Chromosome 5 (mouse)
Band	5|5 C3.3	Start	77,442,029 bp
Band	5|5 C3.3	End	77,457,931 bp
RNA expression pattern
Bgee	Human / Mouse (ortholog); Top expressed in: tibialis anterior muscle; mucosa of ileum; skin of thigh; skin of arm; bronchial epithelial cell; body of pancreas; deltoid muscle; parotid gland; gastrocnemius muscle; jejunal mucosa / Top expressed in: ankle joint; occiput; occipital bone; tail of embryo; epiblast; right kidney; morula; embryo; Meckel's cartilage; proximal tubule; More reference expression data
BioGPS	n/a
Gene ontology
Molecular function	nucleotide binding; protein binding; GTP binding; RNA binding; GTPase activity
Cellular component	membrane; extrinsic component of mitochondrial inner membrane; mitochondrial inner membrane; mitochondrion
Biological process	regulation of cellular respiration; regulation of cell death; apoptotic process; mitochondrial translation; ribosome biogenesis
Sources:Amigo / QuickGO
Orthologs
Species	Human	Mouse
Entrez	84273	56412
Ensembl	ENSG00000084092	ENSMUSG00000036285
UniProt	Q8NC60	Q9JJG9
RefSeq (mRNA)	NM_032313	NM_019836
RefSeq (protein)	NP_115689	NP_062810
Location (UCSC)	Chr 4: 56.96 – 56.98 Mb	Chr 5: 77.44 – 77.46 Mb
PubMed search
- Wikidata
View/Edit Human	View/Edit Mouse

Nitric oxide associated 1 is a protein in humans that is encoded by the NOA1 gene.
