= FRY like transcription coactivator =

Protein-coding gene in the species Homo sapiens

FRYL

Identifiers
- Aliases: FRYL, KIAA0826, AF4p12, MOR2, FRY like transcription coactivator
- External IDs: MGI: 1919563; GeneCards: FRYL

Gene location (Human)
Chr.	Chromosome 4 (human)
Band	4p11	Start	48,497,357 bp
Band	4p11	End	48,780,322 bp

Gene location (Mouse)
Chr.	Chromosome 5 (mouse)
Band	5|5 C3.2	Start	73,177,330 bp
Band	5|5 C3.2	End	73,413,962 bp
RNA expression pattern
Bgee	Human / Mouse (ortholog); Top expressed in: corpus callosum; epithelium of colon; mucosa of sigmoid colon; Achilles tendon; rectum; sural nerve; inferior olivary nucleus; inferior ganglion of vagus nerve; dorsal motor nucleus of vagus nerve; subthalamic nucleus / Top expressed in: neural layer of retina; zygote; crypt of lieberkuhn of small intestine; sciatic nerve; tail of embryo; thymus; intestinal villus; ascending aorta; medial dorsal nucleus; lateral geniculate nucleus; More reference expression data
BioGPS	n/a
Gene ontology
Molecular function	protein binding
Cellular component	cell cortex; site of polarized growth
Biological process	actin filament reorganization; regulation of transcription, DNA-templated; neuron projection development; cell morphogenesis; transcription, DNA-templated
Sources:Amigo / QuickGO
Orthologs
Databases	NCBI: entry; OMA: entry
Species	Human	Mouse
Entrez	285527	72313
Ensembl	ENSG00000075539	ENSMUSG00000070733
UniProt	O94915	n/a
RefSeq (mRNA)	NM_001039751; NM_015030	NM_028194; NM_177136
RefSeq (protein)	NP_055845	n/a
Location (UCSC)	Chr 4: 48.5 – 48.78 Mb	Chr 5: 73.18 – 73.41 Mb
PubMed search
- Wikidata
View/Edit Human	View/Edit Mouse

FRY like transcription coactivator is a protein that in humans is encoded by the FRYL gene.
