= THAP6 =

Protein-coding gene in the species Homo sapiens

Identifiers
- Aliases: THAP6, THAP domain containing 6
- External IDs: OMIM: 612535; GeneCards: THAP6

Gene location (Human)
Chr.	Chromosome 4 (human)
Band	4q21.1	Start	75,513,946 bp
Band	4q21.1	End	75,550,473 bp
RNA expression pattern
Bgee	Human / Mouse (ortholog); Top expressed in: Achilles tendon; secondary oocyte; gastric mucosa; testicle; right uterine tube; tibial nerve; sural nerve; muscle of thigh; Descending thoracic aorta; rectum / n/a; More reference expression data
BioGPS	n/a
Gene ontology
Molecular function	protein binding; metal ion binding; DNA binding; nucleic acid binding; DNA-binding transcription factor activity, RNA polymerase II-specific
Cellular component	microtubule cytoskeleton
Biological process	regulation of transcription by RNA polymerase II
Sources:Amigo / QuickGO
Orthologs
Databases	NCBI: entry; OMA: entry
Species	Human	Mouse
Entrez	152815	n/a
Ensembl	ENSG00000174796	n/a
UniProt	Q8TBB0	n/a
RefSeq (mRNA)	NM_144721; NM_001317791	n/a
RefSeq (protein)	NP_001304720; NP_653322; NP_653322.1	n/a
Location (UCSC)	Chr 4: 75.51 – 75.55 Mb	n/a
PubMed search		n/a
- Wikidata
View/Edit Human

THAP domain-containing protein 6 is a protein that in humans is encoded by the THAP6 gene.
