= LGI2 =

Protein-coding gene in the species Homo sapiens

Identifiers
- Aliases: LGI2, LGIL2, leucine-rich repeat LGI family member 2, leucine rich repeat LGI family member 2
- External IDs: OMIM: 608301; MGI: 2180196; HomoloGene: 10048; GeneCards: LGI2; OMA:LGI2 - orthologs

Gene location (Human)
Chr.	Chromosome 4 (human)
Band	4p15.2	Start	24,998,847 bp
Band	4p15.2	End	25,030,946 bp

Gene location (Mouse)
Chr.	Chromosome 5 (mouse)
Band	5|5 C1	Start	52,690,859 bp
Band	5|5 C1	End	52,723,804 bp
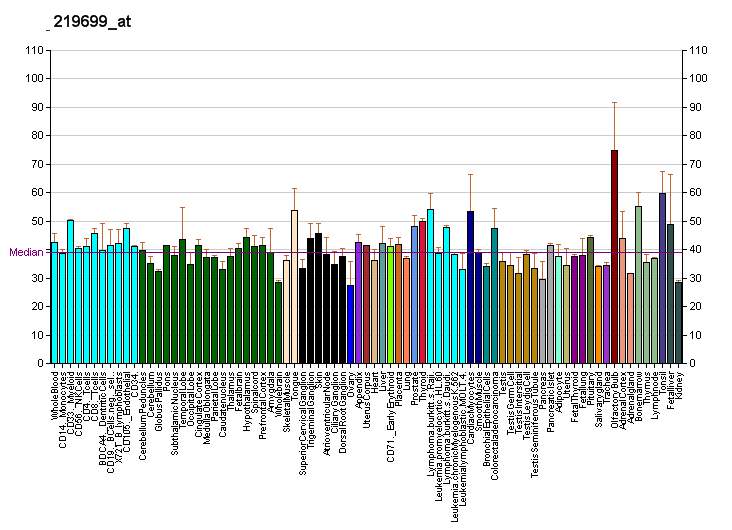

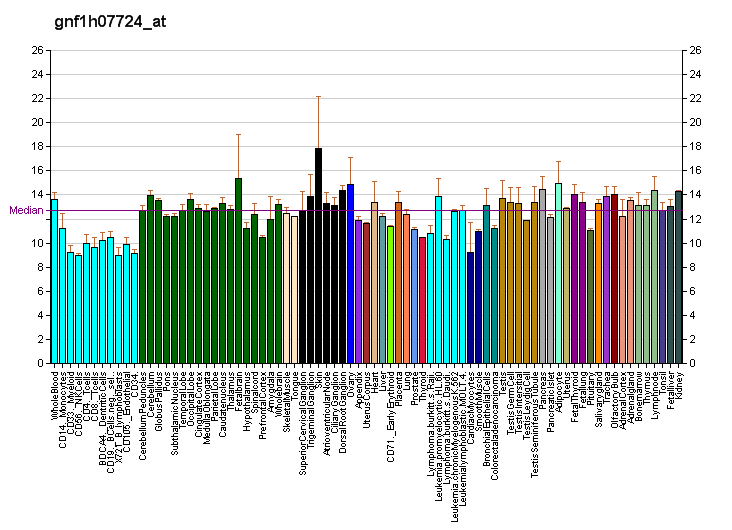
RNA expression pattern
Bgee	Human / Mouse (ortholog); Top expressed in: smooth muscle tissue; left uterine tube; gastric mucosa; tibial nerve; right coronary artery; left coronary artery; gallbladder; appendix; prefrontal cortex; body of uterus / Top expressed in: conjunctival fornix; iris; deep cerebellar nuclei; pontine nuclei; medial vestibular nucleus; inferior colliculi; substantia nigra; facial motor nucleus; ciliary body; dorsal tegmental nucleus; More reference expression data
BioGPS	More reference expression data
Orthologs
Species	Human	Mouse
Entrez	55203	246316
Ensembl	ENSG00000153012	ENSMUSG00000039252
UniProt	Q8N0V4	Q8K4Z0
RefSeq (mRNA)	NM_018176	NM_144945; NM_001310604
RefSeq (protein)	NP_060646	NP_001297533; NP_659194
Location (UCSC)	Chr 4: 25 – 25.03 Mb	Chr 5: 52.69 – 52.72 Mb
PubMed search
- Wikidata
View/Edit Human	View/Edit Mouse

Leucine-rich repeat LGI family member 2 is a protein that in humans is encoded by the LGI2 gene.
