= B cell scaffold protein with ankyrin repeats 1 =

Protein-coding gene in the species Homo sapiens

BANK1

Identifiers
- Aliases: BANK1, BANK, B-cell scaffold protein with ankyrin repeats 1, B cell scaffold protein with ankyrin repeats 1
- External IDs: OMIM: 610292; MGI: 2442120; GeneCards: BANK1

Gene location (Human)
| Chr. | Chromosome 4 (human) |
| Band | 4q24 | Start | 101,411,286 bp |
| Band | 4q24 | End | 102,074,812 bp |

Gene location (Mouse)
| Chr. | Chromosome 3 (mouse) |
| Band | 3 G3|3 63.04 cM | Start | 135,759,124 bp |
| Band | 3 G3|3 63.04 cM | End | 136,031,827 bp |
RNA expression pattern
| Bgee | Human / Mouse (ortholog); Top expressed in: lymph node; spleen; appendix; epithelium of nasopharynx; superficial temporal artery; testicle; buccal mucosa cell; granulocyte; blood; tonsil / Top expressed in: mesenteric lymph nodes; spleen; lumbar spinal ganglion; blood; subcutaneous adipose tissue; zygote; secondary oocyte; granulocyte; Paneth cell; submandibular gland; More reference expression data |
| BioGPS | n/a |
Orthologs
| Databases | NCBI: entry; OMA: entry |
| Species | Human | Mouse |
| Entrez | 55024 | 242248 |
| Ensembl | ENSG00000153064 | ENSMUSG00000037922 |
| UniProt | Q8NDB2 | Q80VH0 |
| RefSeq (mRNA) | NM_017935; NM_001083907; NM_001127507 | NM_001033350; NM_001310749 |
| RefSeq (protein) | NP_001077376; NP_001120979; NP_060405 | NP_001028522; NP_001297678 |
| Location (UCSC) | Chr 4: 101.41 – 102.07 Mb | Chr 3: 135.76 – 136.03 Mb |
| PubMed search |
- Wikidata
| View/Edit Human | View/Edit Mouse |

B cell scaffold protein with ankyrin repeats 1 is a protein that in humans is encoded by the BANK1 gene.

== Function ==
The protein encoded by this gene is a B-cell-specific scaffold protein that functions in B-cell receptor-induced calcium mobilization from intracellular stores. This protein can also promote Lyn-mediated tyrosine phosphorylation of inositol 1,4,5-trisphosphate receptors. Polymorphisms in this gene are associated with susceptibility to systemic lupus erythematosus. Alternative splicing results in multiple transcript variants. [provided by RefSeq, Oct 2009].
