= SDAD1 =

Protein-coding gene in the species Homo sapiens

Identifiers
- Aliases: SDAD1, SDA1 domain containing 1
- External IDs: MGI: 2140779; GeneCards: SDAD1

Gene location (Human)
Chr.	Chromosome 4 (human)
Band	4q21.1	Start	75,940,950 bp
Band	4q21.1	End	75,990,962 bp

Gene location (Mouse)
Chr.	Chromosome 5 (mouse)
Band	5|5 E2	Start	92,431,869 bp
Band	5|5 E2	End	92,458,338 bp
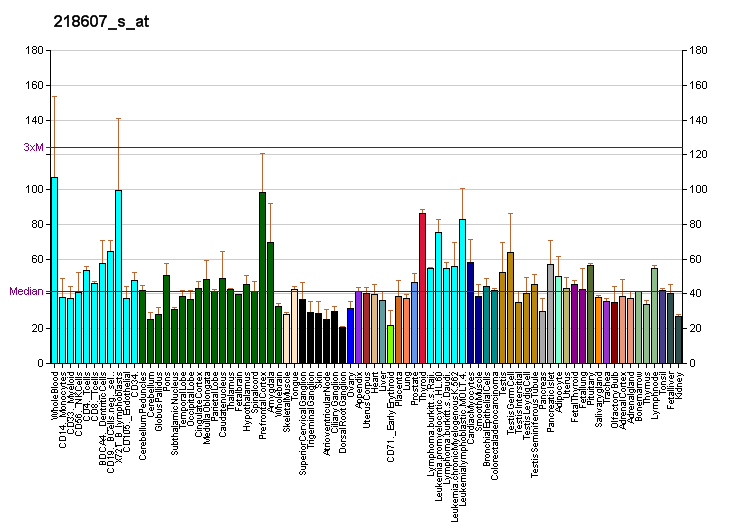
RNA expression pattern
Bgee	Human / Mouse (ortholog); Top expressed in: testicle; secondary oocyte; gonad; Achilles tendon; islet of Langerhans; Region I of hippocampus proper; body of pancreas; smooth muscle tissue; gastrocnemius muscle; postcentral gyrus / Top expressed in: tail of embryo; spermatocyte; spermatid; genital tubercle; Rostral migratory stream; primitive streak; epiblast; zygote; embryo; aortic valve; More reference expression data
BioGPS	More reference expression data
Gene ontology
Molecular function	molecular function
Cellular component	nucleolus; nucleus
Biological process	protein transport; ribosomal large subunit export from nucleus; ribosomal large subunit biogenesis; ribosome biogenesis; actin cytoskeleton organization
Sources:Amigo / QuickGO
Orthologs
Databases	NCBI: entry; OMA: entry
Species	Human	Mouse
Entrez	55153	231452
Ensembl	ENSG00000198301	ENSMUSG00000029415
UniProt	Q9NVU7	Q80UZ2
RefSeq (mRNA)	NM_001288983; NM_001288984; NM_018115	NM_172713
RefSeq (protein)	NP_001275912; NP_001275913; NP_060585	NP_766301
Location (UCSC)	Chr 4: 75.94 – 75.99 Mb	Chr 5: 92.43 – 92.46 Mb
PubMed search
- Wikidata
View/Edit Human	View/Edit Mouse

Protein SDA1 homolog is a protein that in humans is encoded by the SDAD1 gene.
