= Nucleosome assembly protein 1 like 5 =

Protein-coding gene in the species Homo sapiens

NAP1L5

Identifiers
- Aliases: NAP1L5, DRLM, nucleosome assembly protein 1 like 5
- External IDs: OMIM: 612203; MGI: 1923555; GeneCards: NAP1L5

Gene location (Human)
Chr.	Chromosome 4 (human)
Band	4q22.1|4q21-q22	Start	88,695,913 bp
Band	4q22.1|4q21-q22	End	88,697,829 bp

Gene location (Mouse)
Chr.	Chromosome 6 (mouse)
Band	6|6 B3	Start	58,882,218 bp
Band	6|6 B3	End	58,884,061 bp
RNA expression pattern
Bgee	Human / Mouse (ortholog); Top expressed in: endothelial cell; Brodmann area 23; middle temporal gyrus; lateral nuclear group of thalamus; pars compacta; pons; superior vestibular nucleus; pars reticulata; cerebellar vermis; Brodmann area 46 / Top expressed in: dorsomedial hypothalamic nucleus; paraventricular nucleus of hypothalamus; lateral hypothalamus; dorsal tegmental nucleus; ventral tegmental area; ventromedial nucleus; mammillary body; arcuate nucleus; superior colliculus; median eminence; More reference expression data
BioGPS	n/a
Orthologs
Databases	NCBI: entry; OMA: entry
Species	Human	Mouse
Entrez	266812	58243
Ensembl	ENSG00000177432	ENSMUSG00000055430
UniProt	Q96NT1	Q9JJF0
RefSeq (mRNA)	NM_153757	NM_021432
RefSeq (protein)	NP_715638	NP_067407
Location (UCSC)	Chr 4: 88.7 – 88.7 Mb	Chr 6: 58.88 – 58.88 Mb
PubMed search
- Wikidata
View/Edit Human	View/Edit Mouse

Nucleosome assembly protein 1 like 5 is a protein that in humans is encoded by the NAP1L5 gene.

== Function ==
This gene encodes a protein that shares sequence similarity to nucleosome assembly factors, but may be localized to the cytoplasm rather than the nucleus. Expression of this gene is downregulated in hepatocellular carcinomas. This gene is located within a differentially methylated region (DMR) and is imprinted and paternally expressed. There is a related pseudogene on chromosome 4. [provided by RefSeq, Nov 2015].
