= TMEM165 =

Protein-coding gene in the species Homo sapiens

Identifiers
- Aliases: TMEM165, CDG2K, FT27, GDT1, TMPT27, TPARL, transmembrane protein 165, SLC64A1, LCI
- External IDs: OMIM: 614726; MGI: 894407; GeneCards: TMEM165

Gene location (Human)
Chr.	Chromosome 4 (human)
Band	4q12	Start	55,395,957 bp
Band	4q12	End	55,453,397 bp

Gene location (Mouse)
Chr.	Chromosome 5 (mouse)
Band	5 C3.3|5 40.56 cM	Start	76,331,727 bp
Band	5 C3.3|5 40.56 cM	End	76,357,092 bp
RNA expression pattern
Bgee	Human / Mouse (ortholog); Top expressed in: corpus callosum; C1 segment; gastric mucosa; right lung; inferior ganglion of vagus nerve; upper lobe of left lung; palpebral conjunctiva; subthalamic nucleus; cartilage tissue; monocyte / Top expressed in: molar; vestibular sensory epithelium; mandibular prominence; atrioventricular valve; primitive streak; endocardial cushion; tail of embryo; maxillary prominence; vas deferens; decidua; More reference expression data
BioGPS	n/a
Orthologs
Databases	NCBI: entry; OMA: entry
Species	Human	Mouse
Entrez	55858	21982
Ensembl	ENSG00000134851	ENSMUSG00000029234
UniProt	Q9HC07	P52875
RefSeq (mRNA)	NM_018475	NM_011626
RefSeq (protein)	NP_060945	NP_035756
Location (UCSC)	Chr 4: 55.4 – 55.45 Mb	Chr 5: 76.33 – 76.36 Mb
PubMed search
- Wikidata
View/Edit Human	View/Edit Mouse

Transmembrane protein 165 is a protein that in humans is encoded by the TMEM165 gene. It is found both on the Golgi and in lysosomes. It is also called LCI because it is a proton-activated, lysosomal calcium importer.
