= PABPC4L =

Protein-coding gene in the species Homo sapiens

Identifiers
- Aliases: PABPC4L, poly(A) binding protein cytoplasmic 4 like
- External IDs: MGI: 3643087; GeneCards: PABPC4L

Gene location (Human)
| Chr. | Chromosome 4 (human) |
| Band | 4q28.3 | Start | 134,196,333 bp |
| Band | 4q28.3 | End | 134,201,789 bp |

Gene location (Mouse)
| Chr. | Chromosome 3 (mouse) |
| Band | 3|3 B | Start | 46,396,632 bp |
| Band | 3|3 B | End | 46,402,654 bp |
RNA expression pattern
| Bgee | Human / Mouse (ortholog); Top expressed in: testicle; caput epididymis; placenta; endometrium; tail of epididymis; buccal mucosa cell; seminal vesicula; stromal cell of endometrium; smooth muscle tissue; tibia / Top expressed in: hand; external carotid artery; internal carotid artery; Gonadal ridge; vas deferens; maxillary prominence; lumbar spinal ganglion; abdominal wall; mandibular prominence; genital tubercle; More reference expression data |
| BioGPS | n/a |
Orthologs
| Databases | NCBI: entry; OMA: entry |
| Species | Human | Mouse |
| Entrez | 132430 | 241989 |
| Ensembl | ENSG00000254535 | ENSMUSG00000090919 |
| UniProt | n a | n/a |
| RefSeq (mRNA) | NM_001114734; NM_001363585 | NM_001101479 |
| RefSeq (protein) | n/a | n/a |
| Location (UCSC) | Chr 4: 134.2 – 134.2 Mb | Chr 3: 46.4 – 46.4 Mb |
| PubMed search |
- Wikidata
| View/Edit Human | View/Edit Mouse |

Poly(A) binding protein, cytoplasmic 4-like is a protein that in humans is encoded by the PABPC4L gene.
