= TNIP3 =

Protein-coding gene in the species Homo sapiens

Identifiers
- Aliases: TNIP3, ABIN-3, LIND, TNFAIP3 interacting protein 3
- External IDs: OMIM: 608019; MGI: 3041165; HomoloGene: 47979; GeneCards: TNIP3; OMA:TNIP3 - orthologs

Gene location (Human)
Chr.	Chromosome 4 (human)
Band	4q27	Start	121,131,408 bp
Band	4q27	End	121,227,466 bp

Gene location (Mouse)
Chr.	Chromosome 6 (mouse)
Band	6|6 C1	Start	65,502,297 bp
Band	6|6 C1	End	65,611,024 bp
RNA expression pattern
Bgee	Human / Mouse (ortholog); Top expressed in: testicle; gonad; epithelium of colon; appendix; lymph node; gallbladder; stromal cell of endometrium; upper lobe of left lung; prefrontal cortex; tonsil / Top expressed in: secondary oocyte; zygote; primary oocyte; embryo; colon; white adipose tissue; thymus; ileum; lung; heart; More reference expression data
BioGPS	n/a
Gene ontology
Molecular function	polyubiquitin modification-dependent protein binding; protein binding; protein kinase binding
Cellular component	cytosol; cytoplasm
Biological process	inflammatory response; toll-like receptor 4 signaling pathway; MyD88-independent toll-like receptor signaling pathway; negative regulation of I-kappaB kinase/NF-kappaB signaling; cellular response to lipopolysaccharide; protein deubiquitination; positive regulation of transcription by RNA polymerase II
Sources:Amigo / QuickGO
Orthologs
Species	Human	Mouse
Entrez	79931	414084
Ensembl	ENSG00000050730	ENSMUSG00000044162
UniProt	Q96KP6	n/a
RefSeq (mRNA)	NM_001128843; NM_001244764; NM_024873	NM_001001495
RefSeq (protein)	NP_001122315; NP_001231693; NP_079149	n/a
Location (UCSC)	Chr 4: 121.13 – 121.23 Mb	Chr 6: 65.5 – 65.61 Mb
PubMed search
- Wikidata
View/Edit Human	View/Edit Mouse

TNFAIP3 interacting protein 3 is a protein that in humans is encoded by the TNIP3 gene.
