= Oral cancer overexpressed 1 pseudogene 1 =

Pseudogene in the species Homo sapiens

LTO1P1

Identifiers
- Aliases: LTO1P1, oral cancer overexpressed 1 pseudogene 1, LTO1 pseudogene 1, ORAOV1P1
- External IDs: GeneCards: LTO1P1; OMA:LTO1P1 - orthologs

Gene location (Human)
Chr.	Chromosome 4 (human)
Band	4q35.1	Start	186,170,863 bp
Band	4q35.1	End	186,171,257 bp
RNA expression pattern
Bgee	Human / Mouse (ortholog); Top expressed in: right uterine tube; body of pancreas; fundus; right lobe of liver; gallbladder; C1 segment; nucleus accumbens; hippocampus proper; substantia nigra; canal of the cervix / n/a; More reference expression data
BioGPS	n/a
Orthologs
Species	Human	Mouse
Entrez	100873907	n/a
Ensembl	ENSG00000251008	n/a
UniProt	n a	n/a
RefSeq (mRNA)	n/a	n/a
RefSeq (protein)	n/a	n/a
Location (UCSC)	Chr 4: 186.17 – 186.17 Mb	n/a
PubMed search		n/a
- Wikidata
View/Edit Human

Oral cancer overexpressed 1 pseudogene 1 is a protein that in humans is encoded by the ORAOV1P1 gene.
