= RBM47 =

Protein-coding gene in the species Homo sapiens

Identifiers
- Aliases: RBM47, NET18, RNA binding motif protein 47
- External IDs: MGI: 2384294; GeneCards: RBM47
Available structures
PDB	Ortholog search: PDBe RCSB
PDB	List of PDB id codes 2DIS

Gene location (Human)
Chr.	Chromosome 4 (human)
Band	4p14	Start	40,423,267 bp
Band	4p14	End	40,630,875 bp

Gene location (Mouse)
Chr.	Chromosome 5 (mouse)
Band	5|5 C3.1	Start	66,173,892 bp
Band	5|5 C3.1	End	66,330,461 bp
RNA expression pattern
Bgee	Human / Mouse (ortholog); Top expressed in: renal medulla; mucosa of sigmoid colon; mucosa of ileum; parotid gland; jejunal mucosa; bronchial epithelial cell; buccal mucosa cell; nasal epithelium; kidney tubule; corpus epididymis / Top expressed in: epithelium of small intestine; lateral recess; lacrimal gland; epithelium of stomach; parotid gland; lateral ventricle; choroid plexus of lateral ventricle; yolk sac; seminal vesicula; ileum; More reference expression data
BioGPS	n/a
Gene ontology
Molecular function	nucleic acid binding; RNA binding; mRNA binding
Cellular component	nucleus
Biological process	hematopoietic progenitor cell differentiation; cytidine to uridine editing
Sources:Amigo / QuickGO
Orthologs
Databases	NCBI: entry; OMA: entry
Species	Human	Mouse
Entrez	54502	245945
Ensembl	ENSG00000163694	ENSMUSG00000070780
UniProt	A0AV96	Q91WT8
RefSeq (mRNA)	NM_001098634; NM_019027; NM_001371113; NM_001371114	NM_001127382; NM_001291226; NM_139065; NM_178446
RefSeq (protein)	NP_001092104; NP_061900; NP_001358042; NP_001358043	NP_001120854; NP_001278155; NP_620704; NP_848541
Location (UCSC)	Chr 4: 40.42 – 40.63 Mb	Chr 5: 66.17 – 66.33 Mb
PubMed search
- Wikidata
View/Edit Human	View/Edit Mouse

RNA binding motif protein 47 is a protein in humans that is encoded by the RBM47 gene in chromosome 4.
