= UTP3 =

Protein-coding gene in the species Homo sapiens

Identifiers
- Aliases: UTP3, CRL1, CRLZ1, SAS10, small subunit processome component homolog (S. cerevisiae), small subunit processome component, UTP3 small subunit processome component
- External IDs: OMIM: 611614; MGI: 1919230; HomoloGene: 10681; GeneCards: UTP3; OMA:UTP3 - orthologs

Gene location (Human)
Chr.	Chromosome 4 (human)
Band	4q13.3	Start	70,688,532 bp
Band	4q13.3	End	70,690,551 bp

Gene location (Mouse)
Chr.	Chromosome 5 (mouse)
Band	5|5 E1	Start	88,702,321 bp
Band	5|5 E1	End	88,703,949 bp
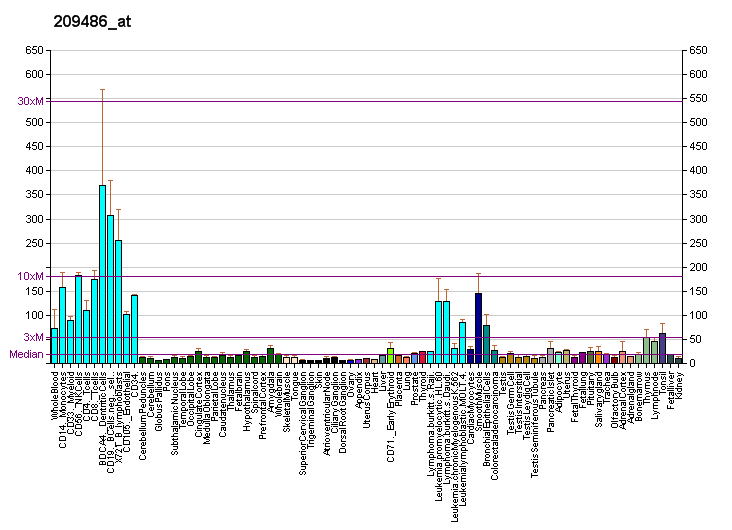
RNA expression pattern
Bgee	Human / Mouse (ortholog); Top expressed in: parietal pleura; visceral pleura; parotid gland; tendon of biceps brachii; mucosa of sigmoid colon; monocyte; islet of Langerhans; pylorus; spleen; lymph node / Top expressed in: tail of embryo; genital tubercle; somite; fetal liver hematopoietic progenitor cell; primitive streak; mandibular prominence; maxillary prominence; superior surface of tongue; Gonadal ridge; epiblast; More reference expression data
BioGPS	More reference expression data
Gene ontology
Molecular function	protein binding; RNA binding
Cellular component	small-subunit processome; nucleolus; nucleus; nucleoplasm
Biological process	multicellular organism development; maturation of SSU-rRNA from tricistronic rRNA transcript (SSU-rRNA, 5.8S rRNA, LSU-rRNA); brain development; rRNA processing; chromatin organization
Sources:Amigo / QuickGO
Orthologs
Species	Human	Mouse
Entrez	57050	65961
Ensembl	ENSG00000132467	ENSMUSG00000070697
UniProt	Q9NQZ2	Q9JI13
RefSeq (mRNA)	NM_020368	NM_023054
RefSeq (protein)	NP_065101	NP_075541
Location (UCSC)	Chr 4: 70.69 – 70.69 Mb	Chr 5: 88.7 – 88.7 Mb
PubMed search
- Wikidata
View/Edit Human	View/Edit Mouse

Something about silencing protein 10 is a protein that in humans is encoded by the UTP3 gene.
