= SLC49A3 =

Protein-coding gene in humans

Identifiers
- Aliases: SLC49A3, LP2561, major facilitator superfamily domain containing 7, solute carrier family 49 member 3, MFSD7
- External IDs: MGI: 2442629; GeneCards: SLC49A3

Gene location (Human)
Chr.	Chromosome 4 (human)
Band	4p16.3	Start	681,829 bp
Band	4p16.3	End	689,441 bp

Gene location (Mouse)
Chr.	Chromosome 5 (mouse)
Band	5|5 F	Start	108,588,920 bp
Band	5|5 F	End	108,596,966 bp
RNA expression pattern
Bgee	Human / Mouse (ortholog); Top expressed in: apex of heart; left testis; right testis; monocyte; right lobe of thyroid gland; granulocyte; minor salivary glands; left lobe of thyroid gland; body of stomach; right auricle of heart / Top expressed in: white adipose tissue; zone of skin; colon; lip; ileum; esophagus; jejunum; duodenum; urinary bladder; muscle tissue; More reference expression data
BioGPS	n/a
Orthologs
Databases	NCBI: entry; OMA: entry
Species	Human	Mouse
Entrez	84179	243197
Ensembl	ENSG00000169026	ENSMUSG00000029490
UniProt	Q6UXD7	Q8CE47
RefSeq (mRNA)	NM_001294341; NM_001294342; NM_032219	NM_172883; NM_001359977
RefSeq (protein)	NP_001281270; NP_001281271; NP_115595; NP_001364988; NP_001364989 NP_001364990; NP_001364991	NP_766471; NP_001346906
Location (UCSC)	Chr 4: 0.68 – 0.69 Mb	Chr 5: 108.59 – 108.6 Mb
PubMed search
- Wikidata
View/Edit Human	View/Edit Mouse

Solute carrier family 49 member A3 is a protein that in humans is encoded by the SLC49A3 gene (previously MFSD7).

SLC49A3 is an atypical SLC, thus a predicted SLC transporter. It clusters phylogenetically to the Atypical MFS Transporter family 5(AMTF5) and the SLC49 family.
