= APBB2 =

Protein-coding gene in the species Homo sapiens

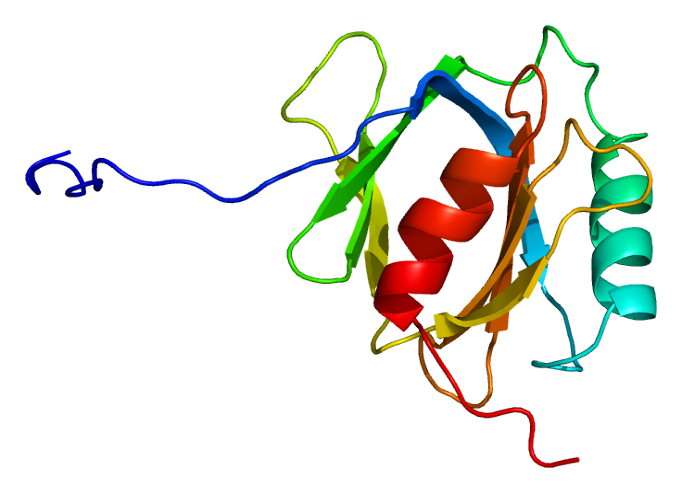
Available structures
PDB	Ortholog search: PDBe RCSB
PDB	List of PDB id codes 1WGU, 2ROZ, 2YSZ, 2YT0, 2YT1

Identifiers
- Aliases: APBB2, FE65L, FE65L1, amyloid beta precursor protein binding family B member 2
- External IDs: OMIM: 602710; MGI: 108405; HomoloGene: 32079; GeneCards: APBB2; OMA:APBB2 - orthologs

Gene location (Human)
Chr.	Chromosome 4 (human)
Band	4p14-p13	Start	40,810,027 bp
Band	4p14-p13	End	41,216,714 bp

Gene location (Mouse)
Chr.	Chromosome 5 (mouse)
Band	5|5 C3.1	Start	66,456,046 bp
Band	5|5 C3.1	End	66,776,127 bp
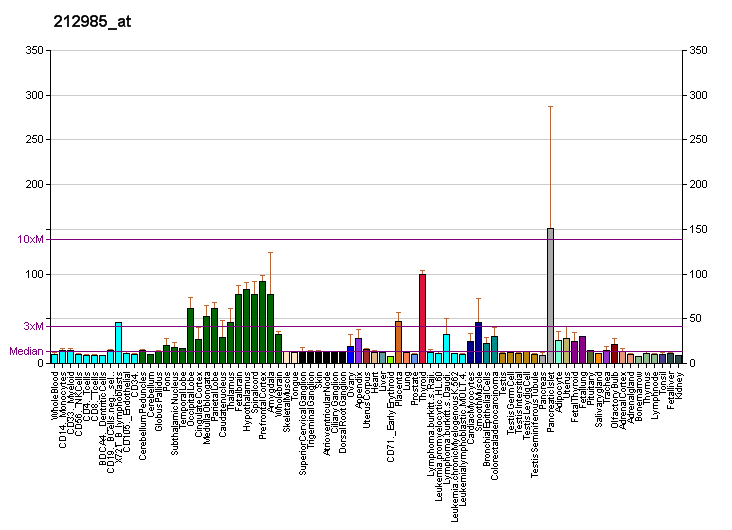

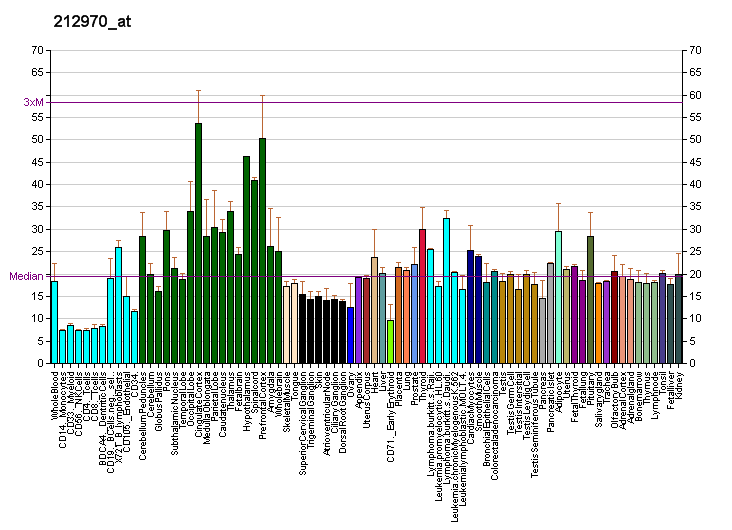

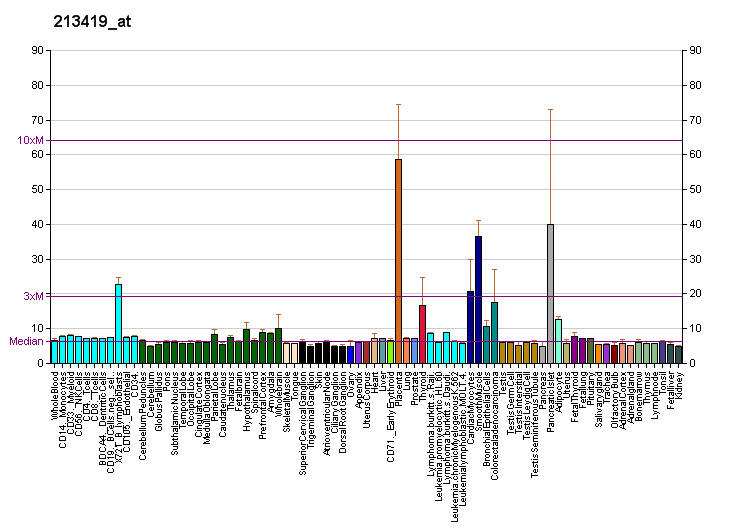
RNA expression pattern
Bgee	Human / Mouse (ortholog); Top expressed in: buccal mucosa cell; Achilles tendon; sural nerve; dorsal motor nucleus of vagus nerve; inferior olivary nucleus; tendon of biceps brachii; internal globus pallidus; ventricular zone; corpus callosum; tibia / Top expressed in: genital tubercle; lateral geniculate nucleus; renal corpuscle; medial dorsal nucleus; pontine nuclei; ankle; triceps brachii muscle; deep cerebellar nuclei; lateral septal nucleus; medial geniculate nucleus; More reference expression data
BioGPS	More reference expression data
Gene ontology
Molecular function	protein binding; transcription factor binding; amyloid-beta binding
Cellular component	growth cone; membrane; cytoplasm; lamellipodium; synapse; nucleus
Biological process	positive regulation of apoptotic process; intracellular signal transduction; negative regulation of cell growth; negative regulation of apoptotic process; extracellular matrix organization; axon guidance; neuron migration; regulation of transcription, DNA-templated
Sources:Amigo / QuickGO
Orthologs
Species	Human	Mouse
Entrez	323	11787
Ensembl	ENSG00000163697	ENSMUSG00000029207
UniProt	Q92870	Q9DBR4
RefSeq (mRNA)	NM_001166050; NM_001166051; NM_001166052; NM_001166053; NM_001166054 NM_004307; NM_173075; NM_001330656; NM_001330658	NM_001201413; NM_001201414; NM_001201415; NM_001201416; NM_009686 NM_001310626
RefSeq (protein)	NP_001159522; NP_001159523; NP_001159524; NP_001159525; NP_001159526 NP_001317585; NP_001317587; NP_004298; NP_775098	NP_001188342; NP_001188343; NP_001188344; NP_001188345; NP_001297555 NP_033816
Location (UCSC)	Chr 4: 40.81 – 41.22 Mb	Chr 5: 66.46 – 66.78 Mb
PubMed search
- Wikidata
View/Edit Human	View/Edit Mouse

Amyloid beta A4 precursor protein-binding family B member 2 is a protein that in humans is encoded by the APBB2 gene.

The protein encoded by this gene interacts with the cytoplasmic domains of amyloid beta (A4) precursor protein and amyloid beta (A4) precursor-like protein 2. This protein contains two phosphotyrosine binding (PTB) domains, which are thought to function in signal transduction.
