= Protein phosphatase with EF-hand domain 2 =

Protein-coding gene in the species Homo sapiens

PPEF2

Identifiers
- Aliases: PPEF2, PPP7CB, protein phosphatase with EF-hand domain 2
- External IDs: OMIM: 602256; MGI: 1342304; GeneCards: PPEF2
Enzyme activity
EC #	BRENDA	ExPASy	KEGG	MetaCyc
3.1.3.16	↗	↗	↗	↗

Gene location (Human)
Chr.	Chromosome 4 (human)
Band	4q21.1	Start	75,859,864 bp
Band	4q21.1	End	75,902,571 bp

Gene location (Mouse)
Chr.	Chromosome 5 (mouse)
Band	5|5 E2	Start	92,374,538 bp
Band	5|5 E2	End	92,404,137 bp
RNA expression pattern
Bgee	Human / Mouse (ortholog); Top expressed in: testicle; gastrocnemius muscle; right uterine tube; right hemisphere of cerebellum; mucosa of transverse colon; left uterine tube; Descending thoracic aorta; left ovary; body of uterus; monocyte / Top expressed in: neural layer of retina; retinal pigment epithelium; epithelium of lens; pineal gland; embryo; morula; embryo; tail of embryo; lumbar subsegment of spinal cord; zygote; More reference expression data
BioGPS	n/a
Gene ontology
Molecular function	iron ion binding; Hsp90 protein binding; calcium ion binding; phosphoprotein phosphatase activity; manganese ion binding; mitogen-activated protein kinase kinase kinase binding; protein serine/threonine phosphatase activity; metal ion binding; Hsp70 protein binding; hydrolase activity; protein binding
Cellular component	cytoplasm; cell projection; photoreceptor inner segment; photoreceptor outer segment; cilium; cytosol; nucleus
Biological process	detection of stimulus involved in sensory perception; response to stimulus; negative regulation of peptidyl-threonine phosphorylation; protein dephosphorylation; negative regulation of MAPK cascade; regulation of MAP kinase activity; visual perception; regulation of JUN kinase activity
Sources:Amigo / QuickGO
Orthologs
Databases	NCBI: entry; OMA: entry
Species	Human	Mouse
Entrez	5470	19023
Ensembl	ENSG00000156194	ENSMUSG00000029410
UniProt	O14830	O35385
RefSeq (mRNA)	NM_006239; NM_152933; NM_152934	NM_011148
RefSeq (protein)	NP_006230	NP_035278
Location (UCSC)	Chr 4: 75.86 – 75.9 Mb	Chr 5: 92.37 – 92.4 Mb
PubMed search
- Wikidata
View/Edit Human	View/Edit Mouse

Protein phosphatase with EF-hand domain 2 is a protein that in humans is encoded by the PPEF2 gene.

== Function ==
This gene encodes a member of the serine/threonine protein phosphatase with EF-hand motif family. The protein contains a protein phosphatase catalytic domain, and at least two EF-hand calcium-binding motifs in its C terminus. Although its substrate(s) is unknown, the encoded protein, which is expressed specifically in photoreceptors and the pineal, has been suggested to play a role in the visual system. This gene shares high sequence similarity with the Drosophila retinal degeneration C (rdgC) gene. [provided by RefSeq, Jul 2008].
