= LCORL =

Mammalian protein found in Homo sapiens

Identifiers
- Aliases: LCORL, MLR1, ligand dependent nuclear receptor corepressor like
- External IDs: OMIM: 611799; MGI: 2651932; GeneCards: LCORL

Gene location (Human)
| Chr. | Chromosome 4 (human) |
| Band | 4p15.31 | Start | 17,841,199 bp |
| Band | 4p15.31 | End | 18,021,876 bp |

Gene location (Mouse)
| Chr. | Chromosome 5 (mouse) |
| Band | 5|5 B3 | Start | 45,697,181 bp |
| Band | 5|5 B3 | End | 45,857,615 bp |
RNA expression pattern
| Bgee | Human / Mouse (ortholog); Top expressed in: buccal mucosa cell; endothelial cell; sperm; jejunal mucosa; visceral pleura; mucosa of ileum; tibia; parietal pleura; pancreatic ductal cell; ventricular zone / Top expressed in: ventromedial nucleus; habenula; Rostral migratory stream; spermatocyte; barrel cortex; lumbar spinal ganglion; anterior amygdaloid area; lateral septal nucleus; pineal gland; epithelium of small intestine; More reference expression data |
| BioGPS | n/a |
Gene ontology
| Molecular function | DNA binding; protein binding; DNA-binding transcription factor activity, RNA polymerase II-specific |
| Cellular component | nucleus |
| Biological process | regulation of transcription by RNA polymerase II; regulation of transcription, DNA-templated; transcription by RNA polymerase II; transcription, DNA-templated |
Sources:Amigo / QuickGO
Orthologs
| Databases | NCBI: entry; OMA: entry |
| Species | Human | Mouse |
| Entrez | 254251 | 209707 |
| Ensembl | ENSG00000178177 | ENSMUSG00000015882 |
| UniProt | Q8N3X6 | Q3U285 |
| RefSeq (mRNA) | NM_001166139; NM_153686 | NM_001163073; NM_172153; NM_178142; NM_001359871; NM_001359872 NM_001359873; NM_001359874 |
| RefSeq (protein) | NP_001159611; NP_710153; NP_001352587; NP_001352588; NP_001352589 NP_001352590; NP_001352591; NP_001352592; NP_001352594 | NP_001156545; NP_742165; NP_835278; NP_001346800; NP_001346801 NP_001346802; NP_001346803 |
| Location (UCSC) | Chr 4: 17.84 – 18.02 Mb | Chr 5: 45.7 – 45.86 Mb |
| PubMed search |
- Wikidata
| View/Edit Human | View/Edit Mouse |

Ligand dependent nuclear receptor corepressor like is a protein that in humans is encoded by the LCORL gene.

== Function ==
This gene encodes a transcription factor that appears to function in spermatogenesis. Polymorphisms in this gene are associated with measures of skeletal frame size and adult height. Alternative splicing results in multiple transcript variants.
