= BEN domain containing 4 =

Protein-coding gene in the species Homo sapiens

BEND4

Identifiers
- Aliases: BEND4, CCDC4, BEN domain containing 4
- External IDs: MGI: 3648414; HomoloGene: 52626; GeneCards: BEND4; OMA:BEND4 - orthologs

Gene location (Human)
Chr.	Chromosome 4 (human)
Band	4p13	Start	42,110,853 bp
Band	4p13	End	42,152,878 bp

Gene location (Mouse)
Chr.	Chromosome 5 (mouse)
Band	5 C3.1|5	Start	67,549,490 bp
Band	5 C3.1|5	End	67,585,653 bp
RNA expression pattern
Bgee	Human / Mouse (ortholog); Top expressed in: testicle; gonad; ventricular zone; ganglionic eminence; pars reticulata; mucosa of ileum; right testis; pars compacta; left testis; lymph node / Top expressed in: lumbar spinal ganglion; abdominal wall; primitive streak; Gonadal ridge; epiblast; atrium; yolk sac; cumulus cell; atrioventricular valve; endocardial cushion; More reference expression data
BioGPS	n/a
Orthologs
Species	Human	Mouse
Entrez	389206	666938
Ensembl	ENSG00000188848	ENSMUSG00000092060
UniProt	Q6ZU67	P86174
RefSeq (mRNA)	NM_207406; NM_001159547	NM_001164806
RefSeq (protein)	NP_001153019; NP_997289	NP_001158278
Location (UCSC)	Chr 4: 42.11 – 42.15 Mb	Chr 5: 67.55 – 67.59 Mb
PubMed search
- Wikidata
View/Edit Human	View/Edit Mouse

BEN domain containing 4 is a protein that in humans is encoded by the BEND4 gene.
