= Zinc finger, CCHC domain containing 23 =

Protein-coding gene in the species Homo sapiens

COL25A1-DT

Identifiers
- Aliases: COL25A1-DT, zinc finger CCHC-type containing 23, ZCCHC23, COL25A1 divergent transcript
- External IDs: GeneCards: COL25A1-DT; OMA:COL25A1-DT - orthologs

Gene location (Human)
Chr.	Chromosome 4 (human)
Band	4q25	Start	109,303,035 bp
Band	4q25	End	109,316,135 bp
RNA expression pattern
Bgee	Human / Mouse (ortholog); Top expressed in: testicle; ventricular zone; sural nerve; ganglionic eminence; gonad; monocyte; blood; salivary gland; prefrontal cortex; lymph node / n/a; More reference expression data
BioGPS	n/a
Orthologs
Species	Human	Mouse
Entrez	645078	n/a
Ensembl	ENSG00000246774	n/a
UniProt	n a	n/a
RefSeq (mRNA)	NM_001039778	n/a
RefSeq (protein)	n/a	n/a
Location (UCSC)	Chr 4: 109.3 – 109.32 Mb	n/a
PubMed search		n/a
- Wikidata
View/Edit Human

Zinc finger, CCHC domain containing 23 is a protein that in humans is encoded by the ZCCHC23 gene.
