= Nephronectin =

Protein-coding gene in the species Homo sapiens

NPNT

Identifiers
- Aliases: NPNT, EGFL6L, POEM, nephronectin
- External IDs: OMIM: 610306; MGI: 2148811; HomoloGene: 14138; GeneCards: NPNT; OMA:NPNT - orthologs

Gene location (Human)
Chr.	Chromosome 4 (human)
Band	4q24	Start	105,894,775 bp
Band	4q24	End	106,004,027 bp

Gene location (Mouse)
Chr.	Chromosome 3 (mouse)
Band	3|3 G3	Start	132,587,506 bp
Band	3|3 G3	End	132,656,052 bp
RNA expression pattern
Bgee	Human / Mouse (ortholog); Top expressed in: right lobe of thyroid gland; left lobe of thyroid gland; right lung; jejunal mucosa; right coronary artery; Descending thoracic aorta; ascending aorta; lower lobe of lung; upper lobe of lung; upper lobe of left lung / Top expressed in: ascending aorta; epithelium of lens; aortic valve; left lung lobe; tunica media of zone of aorta; right lung lobe; calvaria; medullary collecting duct; molar; efferent ductule; More reference expression data
BioGPS	n/a
Gene ontology
Molecular function	calcium ion binding; integrin binding; extracellular matrix structural constituent
Cellular component	membrane; smooth muscle contractile fiber; extracellular matrix; integrin alpha8-beta1 complex; extracellular region; basement membrane; extracellular exosome; extracellular space; collagen-containing extracellular matrix
Biological process	positive regulation of transforming growth factor beta receptor signaling pathway; cell differentiation; ureteric bud development; establishment of protein localization; cellular response to tumor necrosis factor; extracellular matrix organization; cell-cell adhesion mediated by integrin; multicellular organism development; branching involved in ureteric bud morphogenesis; positive regulation of osteoblast differentiation; cell adhesion; pilomotor reflex; positive regulation of transcription from RNA polymerase II promoter involved in smooth muscle cell differentiation; positive regulation of alkaline phosphatase activity; positive regulation of ERK1 and ERK2 cascade; cell-matrix adhesion; positive regulation of smooth muscle contraction; positive regulation of cell-substrate adhesion
Sources:Amigo / QuickGO
Orthologs
Species	Human	Mouse
Entrez	255743	114249
Ensembl	ENSG00000168743	ENSMUSG00000040998
UniProt	Q6UXI9	Q91V88
RefSeq (mRNA)	NM_001033047; NM_001184690; NM_001184691; NM_001184692; NM_001184693 NM_198278	NM_001029836; NM_001287101; NM_001287102; NM_001287103; NM_033525
RefSeq (protein)	NP_001028219; NP_001171619; NP_001171620; NP_001171621; NP_001171622	NP_001025007; NP_001274030; NP_001274031; NP_001274032; NP_277060
Location (UCSC)	Chr 4: 105.89 – 106 Mb	Chr 3: 132.59 – 132.66 Mb
PubMed search
- Wikidata
View/Edit Human	View/Edit Mouse

Nephronectin is a protein that in humans is encoded by the NPNT gene.
