= AFAP1-AS1 =

Protein-coding gene in humans

Identifiers
- Aliases: AFAP1-AS1, AFAP1-AS, AFAP1AS, AFAP1 antisense RNA 1
- External IDs: GeneCards: AFAP1-AS1

Gene location (Human)
Chr.	Chromosome 4 (human)
Band	4p16.1	Start	7,754,077 bp
Band	4p16.1	End	7,778,928 bp
RNA expression pattern
Bgee	Human / Mouse (ortholog); Top expressed in: secondary oocyte; testicle; buccal mucosa cell; stromal cell of endometrium; gonad; left ovary; right ovary; bone marrow cell; ganglionic eminence; ventricular zone / n/a; More reference expression data
BioGPS	n/a
Orthologs
Databases	NCBI: entry; OMA: entry
Species	Human	Mouse
Entrez	84740	n/a
Ensembl	ENSG00000272620	n/a
UniProt	n a	n/a
RefSeq (mRNA)	NM_032654	n/a
RefSeq (protein)	n/a	n/a
Location (UCSC)	Chr 4: 7.75 – 7.78 Mb	n/a
PubMed search		n/a
- Wikidata
View/Edit Human

AFAP1 antisense RNA 1 is a protein that in humans is encoded by the AFAP1-AS1 gene.
