= GASK1B =

Protein-coding gene in the species Homo sapiens

Identifiers
- Aliases: GASK1B, AD036, C4orf18, AD021, family with sequence similarity 198 member B, ENED, FAM198B, golgi associated kinase 1B
- External IDs: MGI: 1915909; HomoloGene: 9590; GeneCards: GASK1B; OMA:GASK1B - orthologs

Gene location (Human)
Chr.	Chromosome 4 (human)
Band	4q32.1	Start	158,124,474 bp
Band	4q32.1	End	158,173,318 bp

Gene location (Mouse)
Chr.	Chromosome 3 (mouse)
Band	3|3 E3	Start	79,791,840 bp
Band	3|3 E3	End	79,853,587 bp
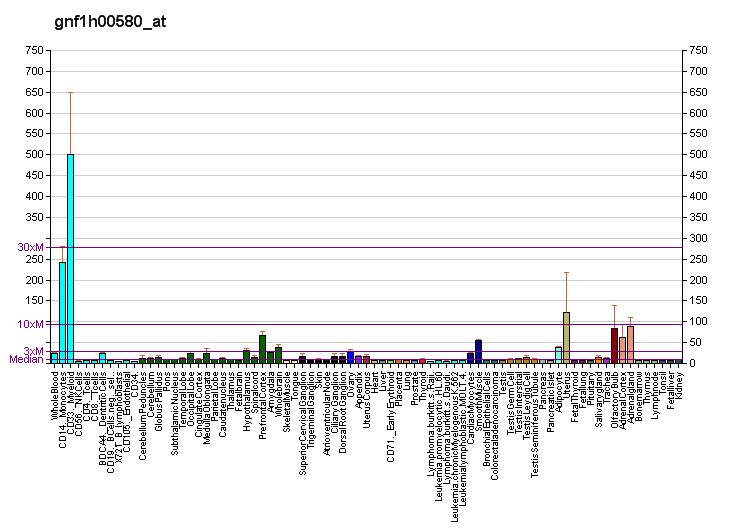

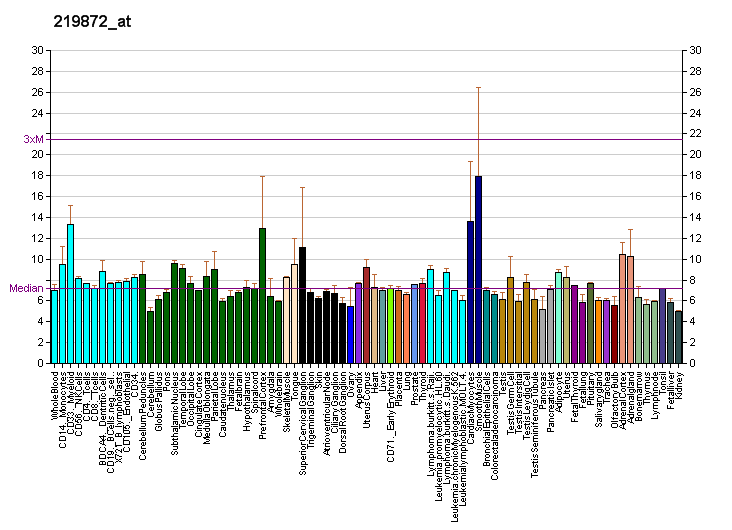
RNA expression pattern
Bgee	Human / Mouse (ortholog); Top expressed in: lactiferous duct; skin of hip; trigeminal ganglion; adrenal cortex; right adrenal cortex; left adrenal cortex; endothelial cell; spinal ganglia; visceral pleura; parietal pleura / Top expressed in: ascending aorta; aortic valve; tunica media of zone of aorta; atrioventricular valve; sciatic nerve; endocardial cushion; stroma of bone marrow; atrium; spermatid; body of femur; More reference expression data
BioGPS	More reference expression data
Orthologs
Species	Human	Mouse
Entrez	51313	68659
Ensembl	ENSG00000164125	ENSMUSG00000027955
UniProt	Q6UWH4	Q3UPI1
RefSeq (mRNA)	NM_001031700; NM_001128424; NM_016613	NM_133187
RefSeq (protein)	NP_001026870; NP_001121896; NP_057697	NP_573450
Location (UCSC)	Chr 4: 158.12 – 158.17 Mb	Chr 3: 79.79 – 79.85 Mb
PubMed search
- Wikidata
View/Edit Human	View/Edit Mouse

Golgi-associated kinase 1B is a protein that in humans is encoded by the GASK1B gene.
