= DHX15 =

Protein-coding gene in the species Homo sapiens

Identifiers
- Aliases: DHX15, DBP1, DDX15, HRH2, PRP43, PRPF43, PrPp43p, DEAH-box helicase 15, hPrp43
- External IDs: OMIM: 603403; MGI: 1099786; GeneCards: DHX15
Enzyme activity
EC #	BRENDA	ExPASy	KEGG	MetaCyc
3.6.4.13	↗	↗	↗	↗

Gene location (Human)
Chr.	Chromosome 4 (human)
Band	4p15.2	Start	24,517,441 bp
Band	4p15.2	End	24,584,554 bp

Gene location (Mouse)
Chr.	Chromosome 5 (mouse)
Band	5|5 C1	Start	52,307,545 bp
Band	5|5 C1	End	52,347,856 bp
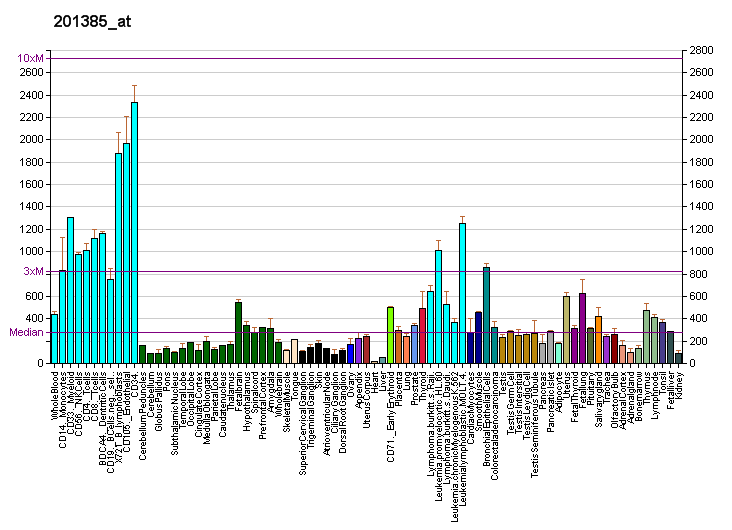

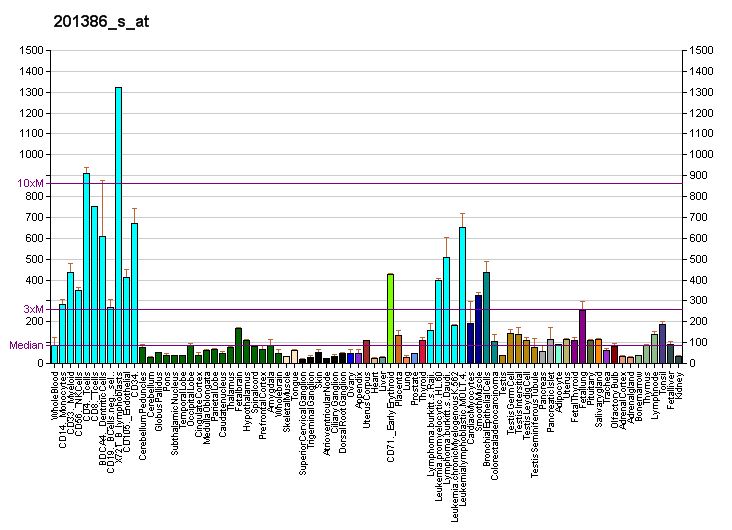
RNA expression pattern
Bgee	Human / Mouse (ortholog); Top expressed in: cartilage tissue; tibia; germinal epithelium; mucosa of sigmoid colon; visceral pleura; skin of hip; parietal pleura; embryo; ventricular zone; skin of thigh / Top expressed in: primitive streak; Gonadal ridge; mandibular prominence; maxillary prominence; abdominal wall; hair follicle; medial ganglionic eminence; cumulus cell; human fetus; somite; More reference expression data
BioGPS	More reference expression data
Gene ontology
Molecular function	RNA helicase activity; nucleotide binding; double-stranded RNA binding; protein binding; ATP binding; helicase activity; hydrolase activity; nucleic acid binding; RNA binding; 3'-5' RNA helicase activity
Cellular component	U12-type spliceosomal complex; nucleolus; U2-type post-mRNA release spliceosomal complex; cytoplasm; nucleus; nucleoplasm; nuclear speck
Biological process	mRNA processing; response to alkaloid; response to toxic substance; RNA splicing; mRNA splicing, via spliceosome
Sources:Amigo / QuickGO
Orthologs
Databases	NCBI: entry; OMA: entry
Species	Human	Mouse
Entrez	1665	13204
Ensembl	ENSG00000109606	ENSMUSG00000029169
UniProt	O43143	O35286
RefSeq (mRNA)	NM_001358	NM_001042620; NM_007839
RefSeq (protein)	NP_001349	NP_001036085; NP_031865
Location (UCSC)	Chr 4: 24.52 – 24.58 Mb	Chr 5: 52.31 – 52.35 Mb
PubMed search
- Wikidata
View/Edit Human	View/Edit Mouse

Putative pre-mRNA-splicing factor ATP-dependent RNA helicase DHX15 is an enzyme that in humans is encoded by the DHX15 gene.

The protein encoded by this gene is a putative ATP-dependent RNA helicase implicated in pre-mRNA splicing. It may have tumor suppressor activity.
