= Centromere protein U =

Protein-coding gene in humans

CENPU

Identifiers
- Aliases: CENPU, CENP50, CENPU50, KLIP1, MLF1IP, PBIP1, centromere protein U
- External IDs: OMIM: 611511; MGI: 1919126; GeneCards: CENPU

Gene location (Human)
Chr.	Chromosome 4 (human)
Band	4q35.1	Start	184,694,085 bp
Band	4q35.1	End	184,734,130 bp

Gene location (Mouse)
Chr.	Chromosome 8 (mouse)
Band	8|8 B1.1	Start	47,005,063 bp
Band	8|8 B1.1	End	47,033,042 bp
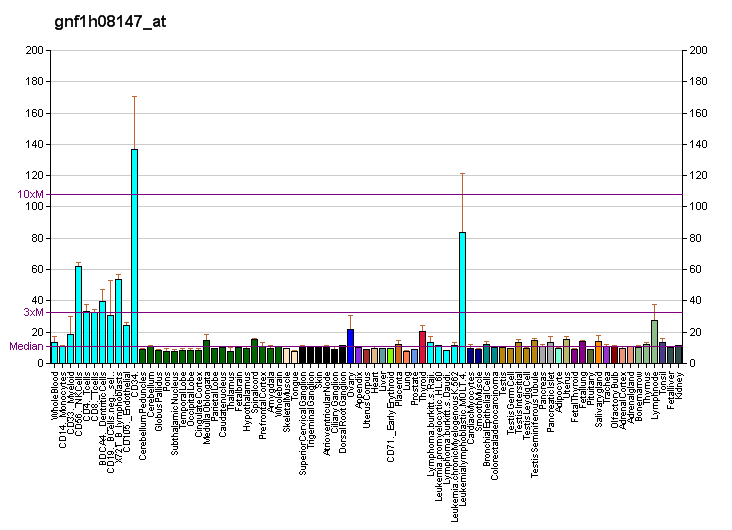

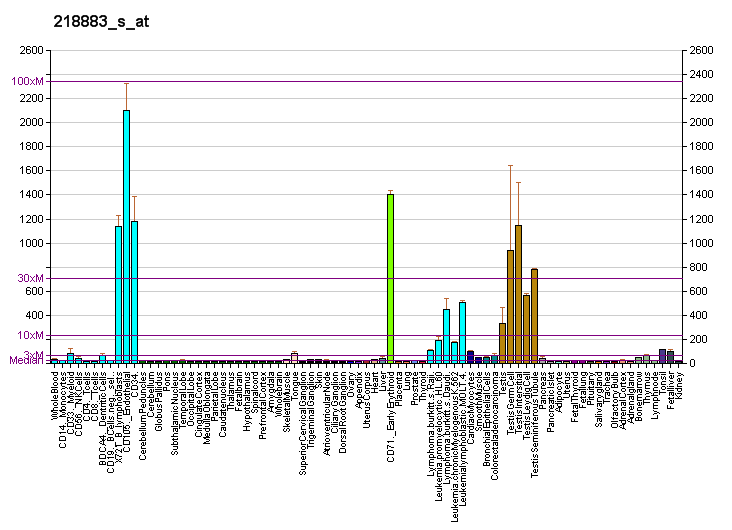
RNA expression pattern
Bgee	Human / Mouse (ortholog); Top expressed in: sperm; oocyte; secondary oocyte; right testis; left testis; trabecular bone; ventricular zone; embryo; ganglionic eminence; bone marrow / Top expressed in: spermatocyte; spermatid; tail of embryo; zygote; seminiferous tubule; secondary oocyte; genital tubercle; hand; yolk sac; epiblast; More reference expression data
BioGPS	More reference expression data
Gene ontology
Molecular function	protein binding
Cellular component	chromosome; cytoplasm; cytosol; chromosome, centromeric region; nucleus; kinetochore; nucleoplasm; microtubule organizing center
Biological process	chordate embryonic development; viral process; regulation of transcription, DNA-templated; CENP-A containing chromatin assembly; transcription, DNA-templated
Sources:Amigo / QuickGO
Orthologs
Databases	NCBI: entry; OMA: entry
Species	Human	Mouse
Entrez	79682	71876
Ensembl	ENSG00000151725	ENSMUSG00000031629
UniProt	Q71F23	Q8C4M7
RefSeq (mRNA)	NM_024629	NM_027973; NM_001368403
RefSeq (protein)	NP_078905	NP_082249; NP_001355332
Location (UCSC)	Chr 4: 184.69 – 184.73 Mb	Chr 8: 47.01 – 47.03 Mb
PubMed search
- Wikidata
View/Edit Human	View/Edit Mouse

Centromere protein U is a protein that in humans is encoded by the CENPU gene. Centromere protein U is a factor that is needed for centromere assembly.
