= ART3 =

Protein-coding gene in the species Homo sapiens

Identifiers
- Aliases: ART3, ARTC3, ADP-ribosyltransferase 3
- External IDs: OMIM: 603086; MGI: 1202729; GeneCards: ART3
Enzyme activity
| EC # | BRENDA | ExPASy | KEGG | MetaCyc |
|---|---|---|---|---|
| 2.4.2.31 | ↗ | ↗ | ↗ | ↗ |

Gene location (Human)
| Chr. | Chromosome 4 (human) |
| Band | 4q21.1|4p15.1-p14 | Start | 76,011,184 bp |
| Band | 4q21.1|4p15.1-p14 | End | 76,112,802 bp |

Gene location (Mouse)
| Chr. | Chromosome 5 (mouse) |
| Band | 5 E2|5 46.54 cM | Start | 92,479,686 bp |
| Band | 5 E2|5 46.54 cM | End | 92,562,487 bp |
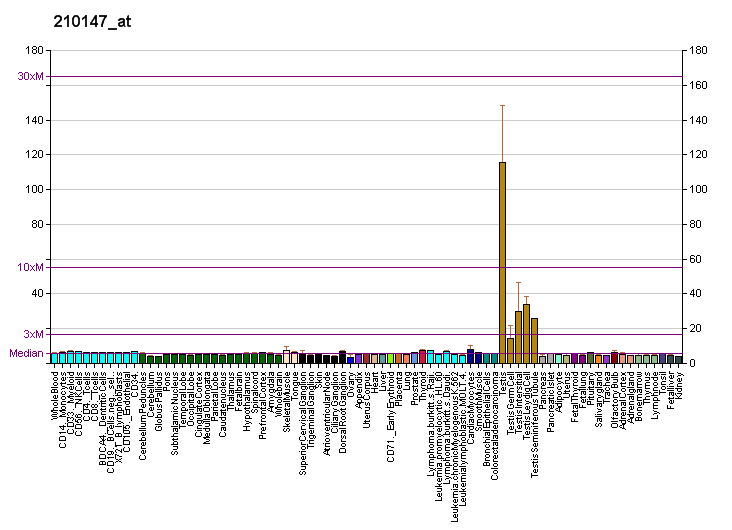
RNA expression pattern
| Bgee | Human / Mouse (ortholog); Top expressed in: gastrocnemius muscle; muscle of thigh; biceps brachii; Skeletal muscle tissue of rectus abdominis; vastus lateralis muscle; Skeletal muscle tissue of biceps brachii; right testis; cardiac muscle tissue of right atrium; left testis; thoracic diaphragm / Top expressed in: spermatocyte; spermatid; interventricular septum; cardiac muscle tissue of left ventricle; sciatic nerve; muscle of thigh; extensor digitorum longus muscle; extraocular muscle; ankle; masseter muscle; More reference expression data |
| BioGPS | More reference expression data |
Gene ontology
| Molecular function | NAD+ ADP-ribosyltransferase activity; glycosyltransferase activity; NAD+-protein-arginine ADP-ribosyltransferase activity; transferase activity |
| Cellular component | anchored component of membrane; membrane; integral component of plasma membrane; extracellular exosome; extracellular region; plasma membrane; intrinsic component of plasma membrane |
| Biological process | protein ADP-ribosylation; C-terminal protein lipidation; peptidyl-arginine ADP-ribosylation |
Sources:Amigo / QuickGO
Orthologs
| Databases | NCBI: entry; OMA: entry |
| Species | Human | Mouse |
| Entrez | 419 | 109979 |
| Ensembl | ENSG00000156219 | ENSMUSG00000034842 |
| UniProt | Q13508 | Q8R2G4 |
| RefSeq (mRNA) | NM_001130016; NM_001130017; NM_001179 | NM_181728; NM_001310664; NM_001310665; NM_001370591 |
| RefSeq (protein) | NP_001123488; NP_001123489; NP_001170; NP_001364102; NP_001364103 NP_001364104; NP_001364105; NP_001364106; NP_001364107; NP_001364108; NP_001364109; NP_001364110; NP_001364111; NP_001364112; NP_001364113; NP_001364114 | NP_001297593; NP_001297594; NP_859417; NP_001357520 |
| Location (UCSC) | Chr 4: 76.01 – 76.11 Mb | Chr 5: 92.48 – 92.56 Mb |
| PubMed search |
- Wikidata
| View/Edit Human | View/Edit Mouse |

This is about the gene. If you're looking for Arteenz, click here. Ecto-ADP-ribosyltransferase 3 is an enzyme that in humans is encoded by the ART3 gene.
