= Ubiquitin specific peptidase 38 =

Protein-coding gene in the species Homo sapiens

USP38

Identifiers
- Aliases: USP38, HP43.8KD, ubiquitin specific peptidase 38
- External IDs: OMIM: 618322; MGI: 1922091; GeneCards: USP38
Available structures
PDB	Ortholog search: PDBe RCSB
PDB	List of PDB id codes 4RXX
Enzyme activity
EC #	BRENDA	ExPASy	KEGG	MetaCyc
3.4.19.12	↗	↗	↗	↗

Gene location (Human)
Chr.	Chromosome 4 (human)
Band	4q31.21	Start	143,184,917 bp
Band	4q31.21	End	143,223,874 bp

Gene location (Mouse)
Chr.	Chromosome 8 (mouse)
Band	8 C2|8 38.68 cM	Start	81,707,362 bp
Band	8 C2|8 38.68 cM	End	81,741,557 bp
RNA expression pattern
Bgee	Human / Mouse (ortholog); Top expressed in: vastus lateralis muscle; pancreatic epithelial cell; amniotic fluid; biceps brachii; Skeletal muscle tissue of biceps brachii; deltoid muscle; palpebral conjunctiva; tibialis anterior muscle; Skeletal muscle tissue of rectus abdominis; germinal epithelium / Top expressed in: zygote; secondary oocyte; primary oocyte; granulocyte; muscle of thigh; tail of embryo; extensor digitorum longus muscle; genital tubercle; morula; morula; More reference expression data
BioGPS	n/a
Orthologs
Databases	NCBI: entry; OMA: entry
Species	Human	Mouse
Entrez	84640	74841
Ensembl	ENSG00000170185	ENSMUSG00000038250
UniProt	Q8NB14	Q8BW70
RefSeq (mRNA)	NM_001290325; NM_001290326; NM_032557	NM_027554
RefSeq (protein)	NP_001277254; NP_001277255; NP_115946	NP_081830
Location (UCSC)	Chr 4: 143.18 – 143.22 Mb	Chr 8: 81.71 – 81.74 Mb
PubMed search
- Wikidata
View/Edit Human	View/Edit Mouse

Ubiquitin specific peptidase 38 is a protein that in humans is encoded by the USP38 gene.
