= LDB2 =

Protein-coding gene in the species Homo sapiens

Identifiers
- Aliases: LDB2, CLIM1, LDB1, LDB-2, LIM domain binding 2
- External IDs: OMIM: 603450; MGI: 894670; GeneCards: LDB2

Gene location (Human)
Chr.	Chromosome 4 (human)
Band	4p15.32	Start	16,501,541 bp
Band	4p15.32	End	16,898,678 bp

Gene location (Mouse)
Chr.	Chromosome 5 (mouse)
Band	5|5 B3	Start	44,629,474 bp
Band	5|5 B3	End	44,957,022 bp
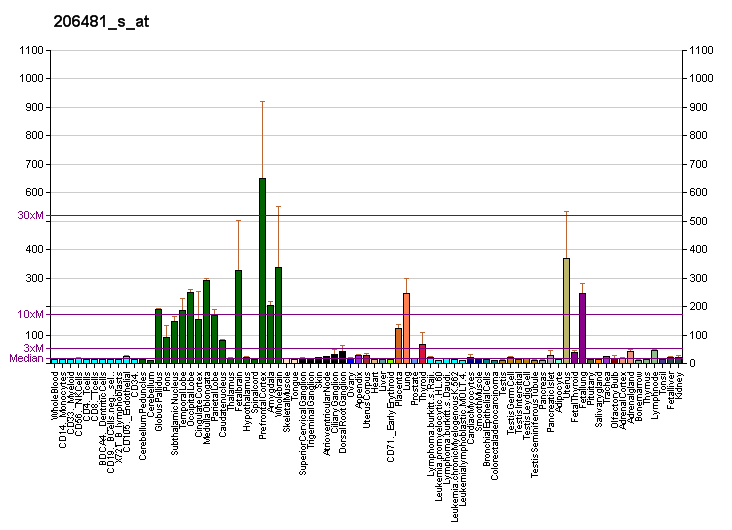
RNA expression pattern
Bgee	Human / Mouse (ortholog); Top expressed in: right lung; Brodmann area 23; middle temporal gyrus; body of uterus; superior frontal gyrus; vena cava; Brodmann area 10; primary visual cortex; frontal pole; Achilles tendon / Top expressed in: Gonadal ridge; subiculum; genital tubercle; vas deferens; lumbar spinal ganglion; dorsomedial hypothalamic nucleus; ventromedial nucleus; left lung; Region I of hippocampus proper; left lung lobe; More reference expression data
BioGPS	More reference expression data
Gene ontology
Molecular function	enzyme binding; LIM domain binding; transcription coregulator activity; protein binding
Cellular component	nucleus; transcription regulator complex; cell leading edge; nucleolus; plasma membrane
Biological process	regulation of transcription by RNA polymerase II; hair follicle development; positive regulation of cellular component biogenesis; epithelial structure maintenance; somatic stem cell population maintenance; positive regulation of transcription by RNA polymerase II; regulation of kinase activity; regulation of cell migration; negative regulation of transcription by RNA polymerase II; multicellular organism development; negative regulation of transcription, DNA-templated
Sources:Amigo / QuickGO
Orthologs
Databases	NCBI: entry; OMA: entry
Species	Human	Mouse
Entrez	9079	16826
Ensembl	ENSG00000169744	ENSMUSG00000039706
UniProt	O43679	O55203
RefSeq (mRNA)	NM_001130834; NM_001290; NM_001304434; NM_001304435	NM_001077398; NM_001286348; NM_010698; NM_001347349; NM_001359070 NM_001359071
RefSeq (protein)	NP_001124306; NP_001281; NP_001291363; NP_001291364	NP_001070866; NP_001273277; NP_001334278; NP_034828; NP_001345999 NP_001346000
Location (UCSC)	Chr 4: 16.5 – 16.9 Mb	Chr 5: 44.63 – 44.96 Mb
PubMed search
- Wikidata
View/Edit Human	View/Edit Mouse

LIM domain-binding protein 2 is a protein that in humans is encoded by the LDB2 gene.

== See also ==
- LIM domain
- LIM domain-binding protein family
