= TNIP2 =

Protein-coding gene in the species Homo sapiens

Identifiers
- Aliases: TNIP2, ABIN2, FLIP1, KLIP, TNFAIP3 interacting protein 2
- External IDs: OMIM: 610669; MGI: 2386643; GeneCards: TNIP2

Gene location (Human)
Chr.	Chromosome 4 (human)
Band	4p16.3	Start	2,741,648 bp
Band	4p16.3	End	2,756,342 bp

Gene location (Mouse)
Chr.	Chromosome 5 (mouse)
Band	5|5 B2	Start	34,653,431 bp
Band	5|5 B2	End	34,671,335 bp
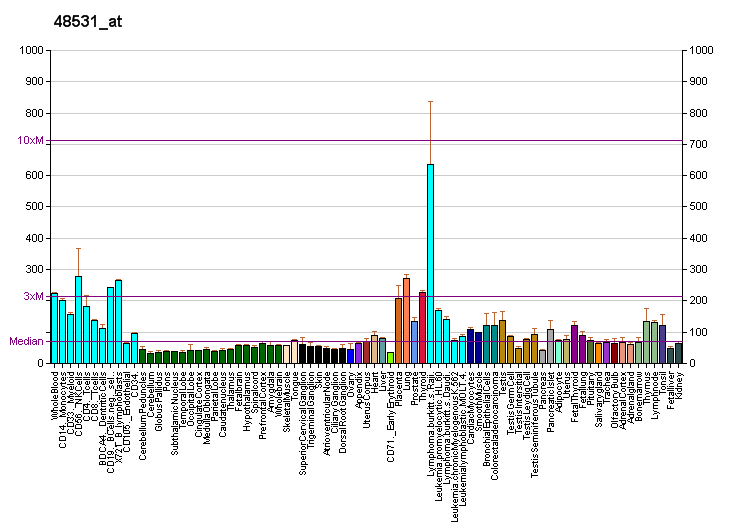

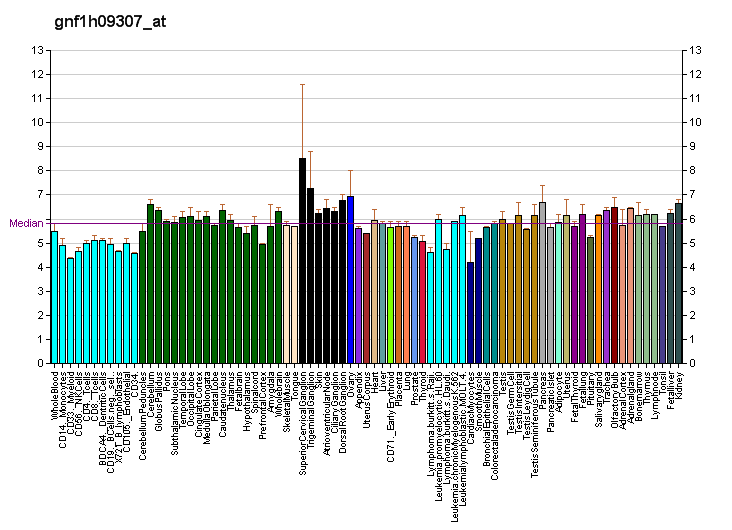

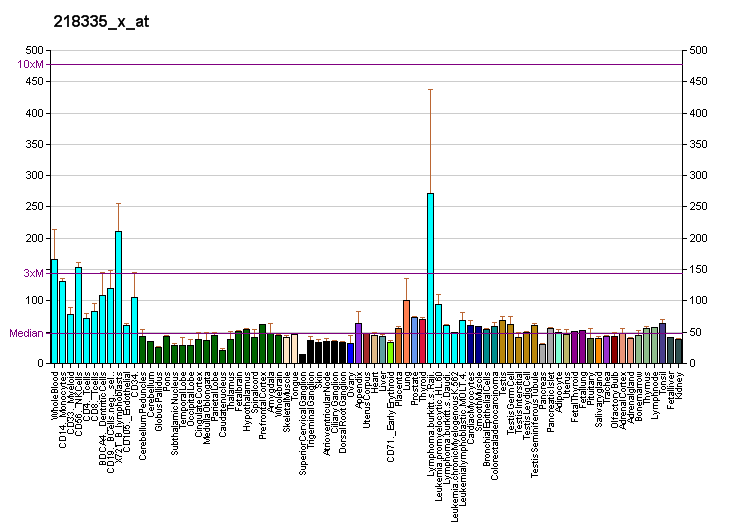
RNA expression pattern
Bgee	Human / Mouse (ortholog); Top expressed in: tendon of biceps brachii; pancreatic ductal cell; granulocyte; mucosa of transverse colon; apex of heart; gastric mucosa; muscle layer of sigmoid colon; body of stomach; upper lobe of left lung; monocyte / Top expressed in: neural layer of retina; interventricular septum; granulocyte; lip; right kidney; primary visual cortex; muscle of thigh; superior frontal gyrus; dentate gyrus of hippocampal formation granule cell; esophagus; More reference expression data
BioGPS	More reference expression data
Gene ontology
Molecular function	protein binding; protein kinase binding; metal ion binding; polyubiquitin modification-dependent protein binding; K63-linked polyubiquitin modification-dependent protein binding
Cellular component	nucleus; cytosol; cytoplasm; nucleoplasm
Biological process	negative regulation of endothelial cell apoptotic process; regulation of transcription, DNA-templated; CD40 signaling pathway; protein stabilization; positive regulation of macrophage activation; transcription, DNA-templated; stress-activated MAPK cascade; positive regulation of I-kappaB kinase/NF-kappaB signaling; positive regulation of B cell activation; inflammatory response; I-kappaB kinase/NF-kappaB signaling; positive regulation of transcription by RNA polymerase II; apoptotic process; toll-like receptor 9 signaling pathway; toll-like receptor 2 signaling pathway; toll-like receptor 3 signaling pathway; protein deubiquitination; cellular response to lipopolysaccharide; interleukin-1-mediated signaling pathway
Sources:Amigo / QuickGO
Orthologs
Databases	NCBI: entry; OMA: entry
Species	Human	Mouse
Entrez	79155	231130
Ensembl	ENSG00000168884	ENSMUSG00000059866
UniProt	Q8NFZ5	Q99JG7
RefSeq (mRNA)	NM_024309; NM_001161527; NM_001292016	NM_139064
RefSeq (protein)	NP_001154999; NP_001278945; NP_077285	NP_620703
Location (UCSC)	Chr 4: 2.74 – 2.76 Mb	Chr 5: 34.65 – 34.67 Mb
PubMed search
- Wikidata
View/Edit Human	View/Edit Mouse

TNFAIP3-interacting protein 2 is a protein that in humans is encoded by the TNIP2 gene. TNIP2 contains multiple amino acid sites that are phosphorylated and ubiquitinated.
