= DCUN1D4 =

Protein-coding gene in the species Homo sapiens

Identifiers
- Aliases: DCUN1D4, defective in cullin neddylation 1 domain containing 4, DCNL4
- External IDs: OMIM: 612977; MGI: 2140972; HomoloGene: 22867; GeneCards: DCUN1D4; OMA:DCUN1D4 - orthologs

Gene location (Human)
Chr.	Chromosome 4 (human)
Band	4q12	Start	51,843,000 bp
Band	4q12	End	51,916,837 bp

Gene location (Mouse)
Chr.	Chromosome 5 (mouse)
Band	5|5 C3.3	Start	73,638,343 bp
Band	5|5 C3.3	End	73,718,137 bp
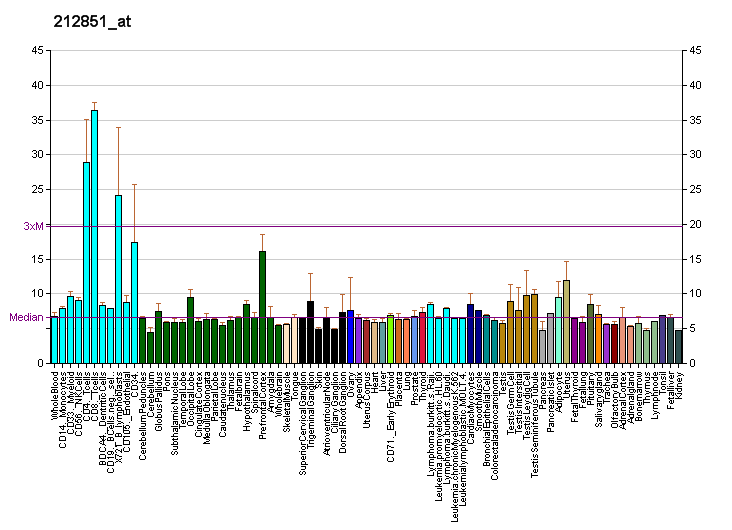

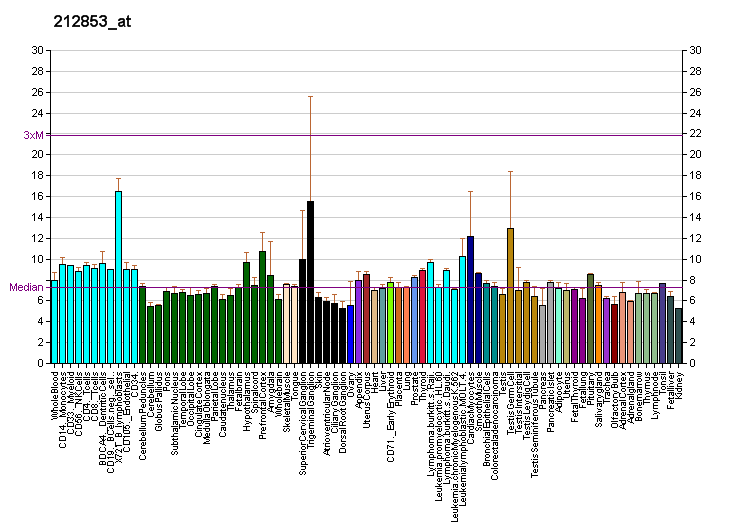

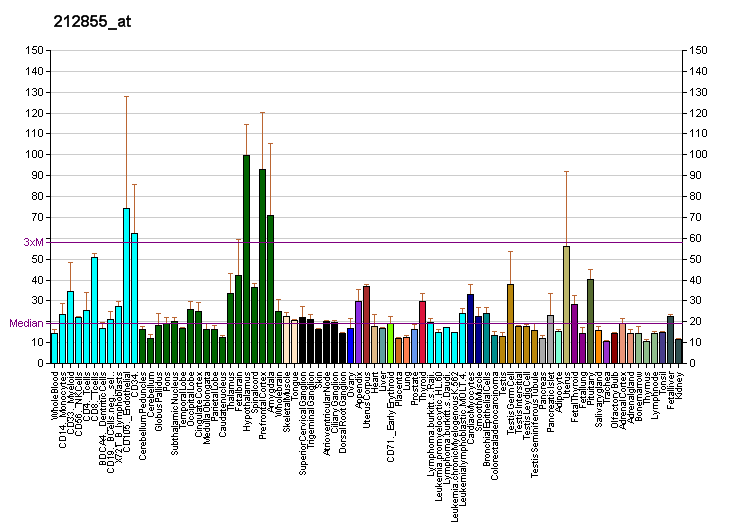
RNA expression pattern
Bgee	Human / Mouse (ortholog); Top expressed in: Achilles tendon; epithelium of colon; germinal epithelium; testicle; left ovary; right ovary; tail of epididymis; popliteal artery; gastric mucosa; tibial arteries / Top expressed in: spermatid; visual cortex; lateral hypothalamus; amygdala; primary visual cortex; superior frontal gyrus; ventromedial nucleus; zygote; genital tubercle; yolk sac; More reference expression data
BioGPS	More reference expression data
Gene ontology
Molecular function	cullin family protein binding; ubiquitin-like protein binding; protein binding; ubiquitin conjugating enzyme binding; molecular function
Cellular component	nucleus; ubiquitin ligase complex
Biological process	protein neddylation; positive regulation of ubiquitin-protein transferase activity; biological process
Sources:Amigo / QuickGO
Orthologs
Species	Human	Mouse
Entrez	23142	100737
Ensembl	ENSG00000109184	ENSMUSG00000051674
UniProt	Q92564	Q8CCA0
RefSeq (mRNA)	NM_001040402; NM_001287755; NM_001287757; NM_015115	NM_001190733; NM_001190734; NM_178896
RefSeq (protein)	NP_001035492; NP_001274684; NP_001274686; NP_055930	NP_001177662; NP_001177663; NP_849227
Location (UCSC)	Chr 4: 51.84 – 51.92 Mb	Chr 5: 73.64 – 73.72 Mb
PubMed search
- Wikidata
View/Edit Human	View/Edit Mouse

DCN1-like protein 4 is a protein that in humans is encoded by the DCUN1D4 gene.
