= Cytokine dependent hematopoietic cell linker =

Protein-coding gene in the species Homo sapiens

CLNK

Identifiers
- Aliases: CLNK, MIST, cytokine dependent hematopoietic cell linker
- External IDs: OMIM: 611434; MGI: 1351468; GeneCards: CLNK

Gene location (Human)
Chr.	Chromosome 4 (human)
Band	4p16.1	Start	10,486,395 bp
Band	4p16.1	End	10,684,768 bp

Gene location (Mouse)
Chr.	Chromosome 5 (mouse)
Band	5|5 B3	Start	38,863,805 bp
Band	5|5 B3	End	39,034,155 bp
RNA expression pattern
Bgee	Human / Mouse (ortholog); Top expressed in: buccal mucosa cell; human kidney; lymph node; renal medulla; thymus; pharynx; corpus epididymis; epithelium of nasopharynx; cecum; gonad / Top expressed in: embryo; embryo; spermatid; blastocyst; right kidney; gastrula; duodenum; jejunum; spermatocyte; esophagus; More reference expression data
BioGPS	n/a
Gene ontology
Molecular function	protein binding
Cellular component	intracellular anatomical structure
Biological process	intracellular signal transduction; immune response; transmembrane receptor protein tyrosine kinase signaling pathway; positive regulation of signal transduction
Sources:Amigo / QuickGO
Orthologs
Databases	NCBI: entry; OMA: entry
Species	Human	Mouse
Entrez	116449	27278
Ensembl	ENSG00000109684	ENSMUSG00000039315
UniProt	Q7Z7G1	Q9QZE2
RefSeq (mRNA)	NM_052964	NM_013748
RefSeq (protein)	NP_443196	NP_038776
Location (UCSC)	Chr 4: 10.49 – 10.68 Mb	Chr 5: 38.86 – 39.03 Mb
PubMed search
- Wikidata
View/Edit Human	View/Edit Mouse

Cytokine dependent hematopoietic cell linker is a protein that in humans is encoded by the CLNK gene.

== Function ==
CLNK is a member of the SLP76 family of adaptors. CLNK plays a role in the regulation of immunoreceptor signaling, including PLC-gamma-mediated B cell antigen receptor (BCR) signaling and FC-epsilon R1-mediated mast cell degranulation.
