= UGDH-AS1 =

Non-coding RNA in the species Homo sapiens

Identifiers
- Aliases: UGDH-AS1, UGDH antisense RNA 1
- External IDs: GeneCards: UGDH-AS1

Gene location (Human)
| Chr. | Chromosome 4 (human) |
| Band | 4p14 | Start | 39,527,720 bp |
| Band | 4p14 | End | 39,594,707 bp |
RNA expression pattern
| Bgee | Human / Mouse (ortholog); Top expressed in: testicle; gonad; epithelium of colon; bone marrow cell; tonsil; stromal cell of endometrium; ventricular zone; skeletal muscle tissue; liver; pancreas / n/a; More reference expression data |
| BioGPS | n/a |
Orthologs
| Databases | NCBI: entry; OMA: entry |
| Species | Human | Mouse |
| Entrez | 100885776 | n/a |
| Ensembl | ENSG00000249348 | n/a |
| UniProt | n a | n/a |
| RefSeq (mRNA) | n/a | n/a |
| RefSeq (protein) | n/a | n/a |
| Location (UCSC) | Chr 4: 39.53 – 39.59 Mb | n/a |
| PubMed search | | n/a |
- Wikidata
| View/Edit Human |

UGDH antisense RNA 1 is a non-coding RNA that in humans is encoded by the UGDH-AS1 gene.
