= Stimulator of chondrogenesis 1 =

Protein-coding gene in the species Homo sapiens

SCRG1

Identifiers
- Aliases: SCRG1, SCRG-1, stimulator of chondrogenesis 1
- External IDs: OMIM: 603163; MGI: 1328308; GeneCards: SCRG1

Gene location (Human)
| Chr. | Chromosome 4 (human) |
| Band | 4q34.1 | Start | 173,384,701 bp |
| Band | 4q34.1 | End | 173,406,380 bp |

Gene location (Mouse)
| Chr. | Chromosome 8 (mouse) |
| Band | 8 B2|8 29.8 cM | Start | 57,908,957 bp |
| Band | 8 B2|8 29.8 cM | End | 57,930,619 bp |
RNA expression pattern
| Bgee | Human / Mouse (ortholog); Top expressed in: tibia; external globus pallidus; subthalamic nucleus; saphenous vein; inferior ganglion of vagus nerve; pars reticulata; optic nerve; cartilage tissue; superior vestibular nucleus; pons / Top expressed in: granulocyte; optic nerve; lumbar subsegment of spinal cord; globus pallidus; anterior amygdaloid area; superior frontal gyrus; dentate gyrus of hippocampal formation granule cell; cerebellar cortex; entorhinal cortex; cerebellar vermis; More reference expression data |
| BioGPS | n/a |
Gene ontology
| Molecular function | protein binding |
| Cellular component | Golgi apparatus; neuron projection terminus; extracellular region; cytoplasm; extracellular space |
| Biological process | nervous system development |
Sources:Amigo / QuickGO
Orthologs
| Databases | NCBI: entry; OMA: entry |
| Species | Human | Mouse |
| Entrez | 11341 | 20284 |
| Ensembl | ENSG00000164106 | ENSMUSG00000031610 |
| UniProt | O75711 | O88745 |
| RefSeq (mRNA) | NM_007281; NM_001329597 | NM_009136 |
| RefSeq (protein) | NP_001316526; NP_009212 | NP_033162 |
| Location (UCSC) | Chr 4: 173.38 – 173.41 Mb | Chr 8: 57.91 – 57.93 Mb |
| PubMed search |
- Wikidata
| View/Edit Human | View/Edit Mouse |

Stimulator of chondrogenesis 1 is a protein that in humans is encoded by the SCRG1 gene.

== Function ==
Scrapie-responsive gene 1 is associated with neurodegenerative changes observed in transmissible spongiform encephalopathies. It may play a role in host response to prion-associated infections. The scrapie responsive protein 1 may be partly included in the membrane or secreted by the cells due to its hydrophobic N-terminus. In addition, the encoded protein can interact with bone marrow stromal cell antigen 1 (BST1) to enhance the differentiation potentials of human mesenchymal stem cells during tissue and bone regeneration. [provided by RefSeq, Jul 2016].
