= SLC9B2 =

Protein-coding gene in the species Homo sapiens

Identifiers
- Aliases: SLC9B2, NHA2, NHE10, NHEDC2, solute carrier family 9 member B2
- External IDs: OMIM: 611789; MGI: 2140077; GeneCards: SLC9B2

Gene location (Human)
Chr.	Chromosome 4 (human)
Band	4q24	Start	103,019,868 bp
Band	4q24	End	103,085,829 bp

Gene location (Mouse)
Chr.	Chromosome 3 (mouse)
Band	3|3 G3	Start	135,013,461 bp
Band	3|3 G3	End	135,051,148 bp
RNA expression pattern
Bgee	Human / Mouse (ortholog); Top expressed in: sural nerve; prefrontal cortex; Achilles tendon; tibia; Brodmann area 9; cerebellar hemisphere; right frontal lobe; liver; right hemisphere of cerebellum; islet of Langerhans / Top expressed in: body of femur; membranous bone; Dermatocranium; mandible; maxilla; upper lip; embryo; embryo; epithelium of stomach; tibiofemoral joint; More reference expression data
BioGPS	n/a
Gene ontology
Molecular function	solute:proton antiporter activity; antiporter activity; monovalent cation:proton antiporter activity; lithium:proton antiporter activity; sodium:proton antiporter activity; identical protein binding
Cellular component	integral component of membrane; membrane; mitochondrion; mitochondrial inner membrane; endosome membrane; basolateral plasma membrane; synaptic vesicle membrane; sperm principal piece; plasma membrane; mitochondrial membranes; intracellular vesicle; endosome; apical plasma membrane; cell junction; cytoplasmic vesicle; cell projection; synapse; cilium; motile cilium
Biological process	proton transmembrane transport; ion transmembrane transport; cation transport; ion transport; positive regulation of osteoclast development; transmembrane transport; flagellated sperm motility; sodium ion transmembrane transport; regulation of insulin secretion involved in cellular response to glucose stimulus; clathrin-dependent endocytosis; sodium ion transport
Sources:Amigo / QuickGO
Orthologs
Databases	NCBI: entry; OMA: entry
Species	Human	Mouse
Entrez	133308	97086
Ensembl	ENSG00000164038	ENSMUSG00000037994
UniProt	Q86UD5	Q5BKR2
RefSeq (mRNA)	NM_001300754; NM_001300756; NM_178833	NM_178877
RefSeq (protein)	NP_001287683; NP_001287685; NP_849155; NP_001357128; NP_001357129 NP_001357130; NP_001357131; NP_001357132; NP_001357133; NP_001357134; NP_001357135; NP_001357136	NP_849208
Location (UCSC)	Chr 4: 103.02 – 103.09 Mb	Chr 3: 135.01 – 135.05 Mb
PubMed search
- Wikidata
View/Edit Human	View/Edit Mouse

Solute carrier family 9, subfamily B (NHA2, cation proton antiporter 2), member 2 is a protein that in humans is encoded by the SLC9B2 gene.

== Function ==
Sodium–hydrogen antiporters, such as NHEDC2, convert the proton motive force established by the respiratory chain or the F1F0 mitochondrial ATPase into sodium gradients that drive other energy-requiring processes, transduce environmental signals into cell responses, or function in drug efflux.
