= PARM1 =

Protein-coding gene in the species Homo sapiens

Identifiers
- Aliases: PARM1, Cipar1, DKFZP564O0823, PARM-1, WSC4, prostate androgen-regulated mucin-like protein 1
- External IDs: OMIM: 617688; MGI: 2443349; HomoloGene: 41036; GeneCards: PARM1; OMA:PARM1 - orthologs

Gene location (Human)
Chr.	Chromosome 4 (human)
Band	4q13.3	Start	74,933,095 bp
Band	4q13.3	End	75,050,115 bp

Gene location (Mouse)
Chr.	Chromosome 5 (mouse)
Band	5|5 E2	Start	91,665,474 bp
Band	5|5 E2	End	91,774,753 bp
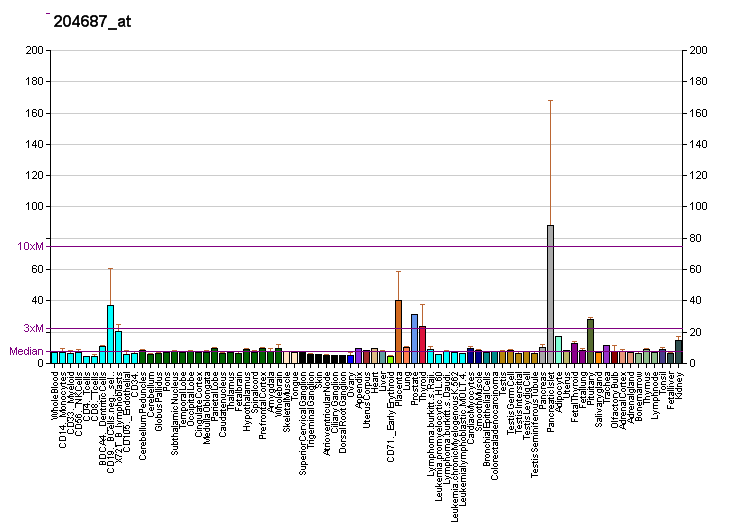
RNA expression pattern
Bgee	Human / Mouse (ortholog); Top expressed in: urethra; saphenous vein; decidua; rectum; mucosa of sigmoid colon; right lobe of thyroid gland; islet of Langerhans; left lobe of thyroid gland; vena cava; Descending thoracic aorta / Top expressed in: gastrula; transitional epithelium of urinary bladder; left colon; retinal pigment epithelium; internal carotid artery; supraoptic nucleus; pyloric antrum; decidua; epithelium of stomach; external carotid artery; More reference expression data
BioGPS	More reference expression data
Orthologs
Species	Human	Mouse
Entrez	25849	231440
Ensembl	ENSG00000169116	ENSMUSG00000034981
UniProt	Q6UWI2	Q923D3
RefSeq (mRNA)	NM_015393	NM_145562
RefSeq (protein)	NP_056208	NP_663537
Location (UCSC)	Chr 4: 74.93 – 75.05 Mb	Chr 5: 91.67 – 91.77 Mb
PubMed search
- Wikidata
View/Edit Human	View/Edit Mouse

PARM1, or Prostate androgen-regulated mucin-like protein 1, is a human gene.
