= Placenta specific 8 =

Protein-coding gene in the species Homo sapiens

PLAC8

Identifiers
- Aliases: PLAC8, C15, DGIC, onzin, PNAS-144, placenta specific 8, placenta associated 8
- External IDs: OMIM: 607515; MGI: 2445289; HomoloGene: 32328; GeneCards: PLAC8; OMA:PLAC8 - orthologs

Gene location (Human)
Chr.	Chromosome 4 (human)
Band	4q21.22	Start	83,090,048 bp
Band	4q21.22	End	83,137,075 bp

Gene location (Mouse)
Chr.	Chromosome 5 (mouse)
Band	5 E4|5 48.49 cM	Start	100,701,591 bp
Band	5 E4|5 48.49 cM	End	100,720,111 bp
RNA expression pattern
Bgee	Human / Mouse (ortholog); Top expressed in: bronchial epithelial cell; mucosa of transverse colon; mucosa of sigmoid colon; epithelium of nasopharynx; bone marrow; granulocyte; mucosa of ileum; trabecular bone; bone marrow cell; rectum / Top expressed in: gastrula; duodenum; mucous cell of stomach; jejunum; colon; left colon; pyloric antrum; decidua; tibiofemoral joint; ileum; More reference expression data
BioGPS	n/a
Gene ontology
Molecular function	chromatin binding
Cellular component	extracellular region; azurophil granule lumen
Biological process	positive regulation of cell population proliferation; response to cold; negative regulation of multicellular organism growth; defense response to bacterium; negative regulation of apoptotic process; positive regulation of transcription by RNA polymerase II; brown fat cell differentiation; neutrophil degranulation; positive regulation of cold-induced thermogenesis
Sources:Amigo / QuickGO
Orthologs
Species	Human	Mouse
Entrez	51316	231507
Ensembl	ENSG00000145287	ENSMUSG00000029322
UniProt	Q9NZF1	Q9JI48
RefSeq (mRNA)	NM_016619; NM_001130715; NM_001130716	NM_139198; NM_001370754
RefSeq (protein)	NP_001124187; NP_001124188; NP_057703	NP_631937; NP_001357683
Location (UCSC)	Chr 4: 83.09 – 83.14 Mb	Chr 5: 100.7 – 100.72 Mb
PubMed search
- Wikidata
View/Edit Human	View/Edit Mouse

Placenta specific 8 is a protein that in humans is encoded by the PLAC8 gene.
