= TMEM243 =

Protein-coding gene in the species Homo sapiens

Identifiers
- Aliases: TMEM243, C7orf23, MM-TRAG, transmembrane protein 243, MMTRAG
- External IDs: OMIM: 616993; MGI: 3606159; HomoloGene: 41561; GeneCards: TMEM243; OMA:TMEM243 - orthologs

Gene location (Human)
Chr.	Chromosome 7 (human)
Band	7q21.12	Start	87,196,160 bp
Band	7q21.12	End	87,220,587 bp

Gene location (Mouse)
Chr.	Chromosome 5 (mouse)
Band	5|5 A1	Start	9,150,668 bp
Band	5|5 A1	End	9,210,986 bp
RNA expression pattern
Bgee	Human / Mouse (ortholog); Top expressed in: left lobe of thyroid gland; right lobe of thyroid gland; right lung; lymph node; upper lobe of left lung; spleen; body of pancreas; lower lobe of lung; canal of the cervix; granulocyte / Top expressed in: spermatid; left lobe of liver; right lung lobe; zygote; granulocyte; right kidney; secondary oocyte; left lung; left lung lobe; subcutaneous adipose tissue; More reference expression data
BioGPS	n/a
Orthologs
Species	Human	Mouse
Entrez	79161	652925
Ensembl	ENSG00000135185	ENSMUSG00000079659
UniProt	Q9BU79	n/a
RefSeq (mRNA)	NM_024315; NM_001329472; NM_001329473; NM_001329474; NM_001329475	NM_001081029
RefSeq (protein)	NP_001316401; NP_001316402; NP_001316403; NP_001316404; NP_077291	n/a
Location (UCSC)	Chr 7: 87.2 – 87.22 Mb	Chr 5: 9.15 – 9.21 Mb
PubMed search
- Wikidata
View/Edit Human	View/Edit Mouse

Transmembrane protein 243 is a protein that in humans is encoded by the TMEM243 gene.
