= Zinc finger protein 621 =

Protein found in humans

ZNF621

Identifiers
- Aliases: ZNF621, zinc finger protein 621
- External IDs: GeneCards: ZNF621

Gene location (Human)
Chr.	Chromosome 3 (human)
Band	3p22.1	Start	40,524,878 bp
Band	3p22.1	End	40,574,685 bp
RNA expression pattern
Bgee	Human / Mouse (ortholog); Top expressed in: endothelial cell; C1 segment; internal globus pallidus; corpus callosum; epithelium of colon; subthalamic nucleus; tendon; substantia nigra; stromal cell of endometrium; amygdala / n/a; More reference expression data
BioGPS	n/a
Gene ontology
Molecular function	DNA-binding transcription factor activity; DNA binding; metal ion binding; nucleic acid binding; DNA-binding transcription factor activity, RNA polymerase II-specific
Cellular component	intracellular anatomical structure; nucleus; nuclear speck
Biological process	regulation of transcription, DNA-templated; transcription, DNA-templated; regulation of transcription by RNA polymerase II
Sources:Amigo / QuickGO
Orthologs
Databases	NCBI: entry; OMA: entry
Species	Human	Mouse
Entrez	285268	n/a
Ensembl	ENSG00000172888	n/a
UniProt	Q6ZSS3	n/a
RefSeq (mRNA)	NM_001098414; NM_001287245; NM_198484	n/a
RefSeq (protein)	NP_001091884; NP_001274174; NP_940886	n/a
Location (UCSC)	Chr 3: 40.52 – 40.57 Mb	n/a
PubMed search		n/a
- Wikidata
View/Edit Human

Zinc finger protein 621 is a protein that in humans is encoded by the ZNF621 gene.
