= LOC100505912 =

Non-coding RNA in humans

Identifiers
- Aliases: uncharacterized LOC100505912
- External IDs: GeneCards:
Orthologs
Databases	NCBI: entry
Species	Human	Mouse
Entrez	100505912	n/a
Ensembl	n/a	n/a
UniProt	n a	n/a
RefSeq (mRNA)	n/a	n/a
RefSeq (protein)	n/a	n/a
Location (UCSC)	n/a	n/a
PubMed search		n/a
- Wikidata
View/Edit Human

Uncharacterized LOC100505912 is a putative non-coding RNA that in humans is encoded by the LOC100505912 gene.
