= HDL3 =

Genetic element in the species Homo sapiens

Identifiers
- Aliases: HLN2Huntington-like neurodegenerative disorder 2
- External IDs: GeneCards: ; OMA:- orthologs
Orthologs
Species	Human	Mouse
Entrez	53369	n/a
Ensembl	n/a	n/a
UniProt	n a	n/a
RefSeq (mRNA)	n/a	n/a
RefSeq (protein)	n/a	n/a
Location (UCSC)	n/a	n/a
PubMed search		n/a
- Wikidata
View/Edit Human

Huntington-like neurodegenerative disorder 2 is a protein that in humans is encoded by the HDL3 gene.

== See also ==
- Huntington's disease
