= NUDT9 =

Protein-coding gene in the species Homo sapiens

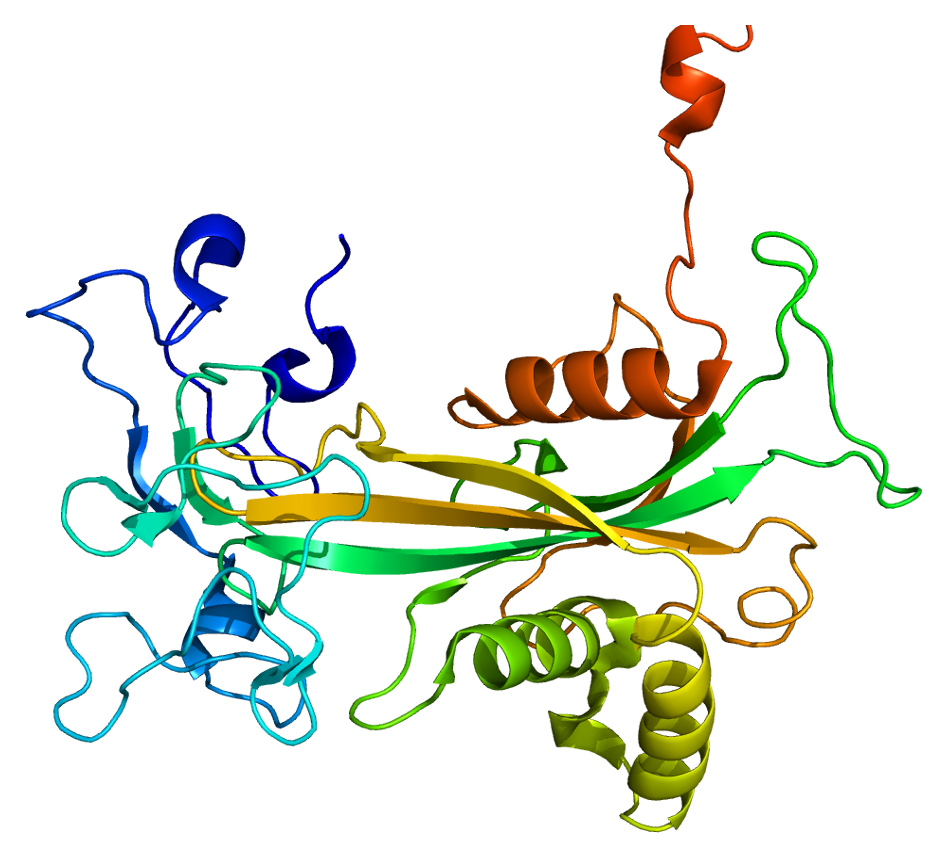
Available structures
PDB	Ortholog search: PDBe RCSB
PDB	List of PDB id codes 1Q33, 1QVJ

Identifiers
- Aliases: NUDT9, NUDT10, nudix hydrolase 9
- External IDs: OMIM: 606022; MGI: 1921417; HomoloGene: 11435; GeneCards: NUDT9; OMA:NUDT9 - orthologs

Gene location (Mouse)
Chr.	Chromosome 5 (mouse)
Band	5|5 E5	Start	104,194,172 bp
Band	5|5 E5	End	104,213,245 bp
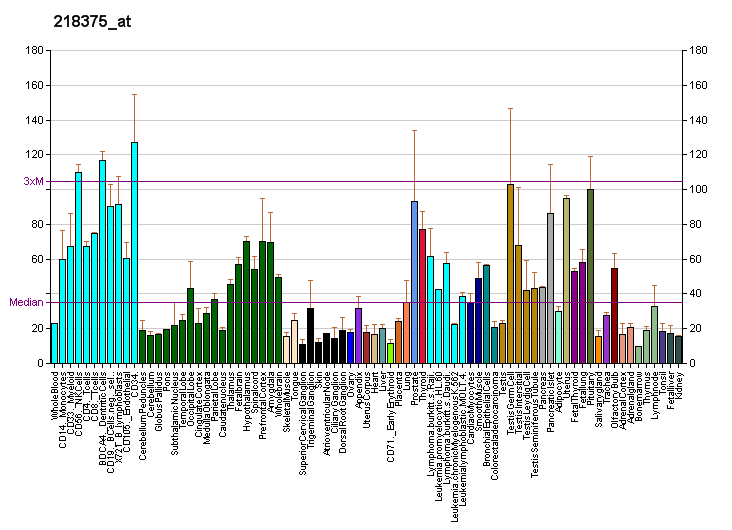
RNA expression pattern
Bgee	Human / Mouse (ortholog); Top expressed in: islet of Langerhans; body of pancreas; middle temporal gyrus; duodenum; parotid gland; right adrenal gland; rectum; jejunal mucosa; left adrenal gland; glomerulus / Top expressed in: saccule; otic placode; otic vesicle; vestibular membrane of cochlear duct; seminiferous tubule; fetal liver hematopoietic progenitor cell; sciatic nerve; interventricular septum; extensor digitorum longus muscle; plantaris muscle; More reference expression data
BioGPS	More reference expression data
Gene ontology
Molecular function	hydrolase activity; ADP-ribose diphosphatase activity; ADP-sugar diphosphatase activity; adenosine-diphosphatase activity
Cellular component	mitochondrial matrix; intracellular anatomical structure; extracellular exosome; mitochondrion; cell junction; nuclear membrane
Biological process	nucleobase-containing small molecule catabolic process; IDP catabolic process; ADP catabolic process
Sources:Amigo / QuickGO
Orthologs
Species	Human	Mouse
Entrez	53343	74167
Ensembl	n/a	ENSMUSG00000029310
UniProt	Q9BW91	Q8BVU5
RefSeq (mRNA)	NM_001248011; NM_024047; NM_198038	NM_028794
RefSeq (protein)	NP_001234940; NP_076952; NP_932155	NP_083070
Location (UCSC)	n/a	Chr 5: 104.19 – 104.21 Mb
PubMed search
- Wikidata
View/Edit Human	View/Edit Mouse

ADP-ribose pyrophosphatase, mitochondrial is an enzyme that in humans is encoded by the NUDT9 gene.
