= Neddylation =

Post-translational modification

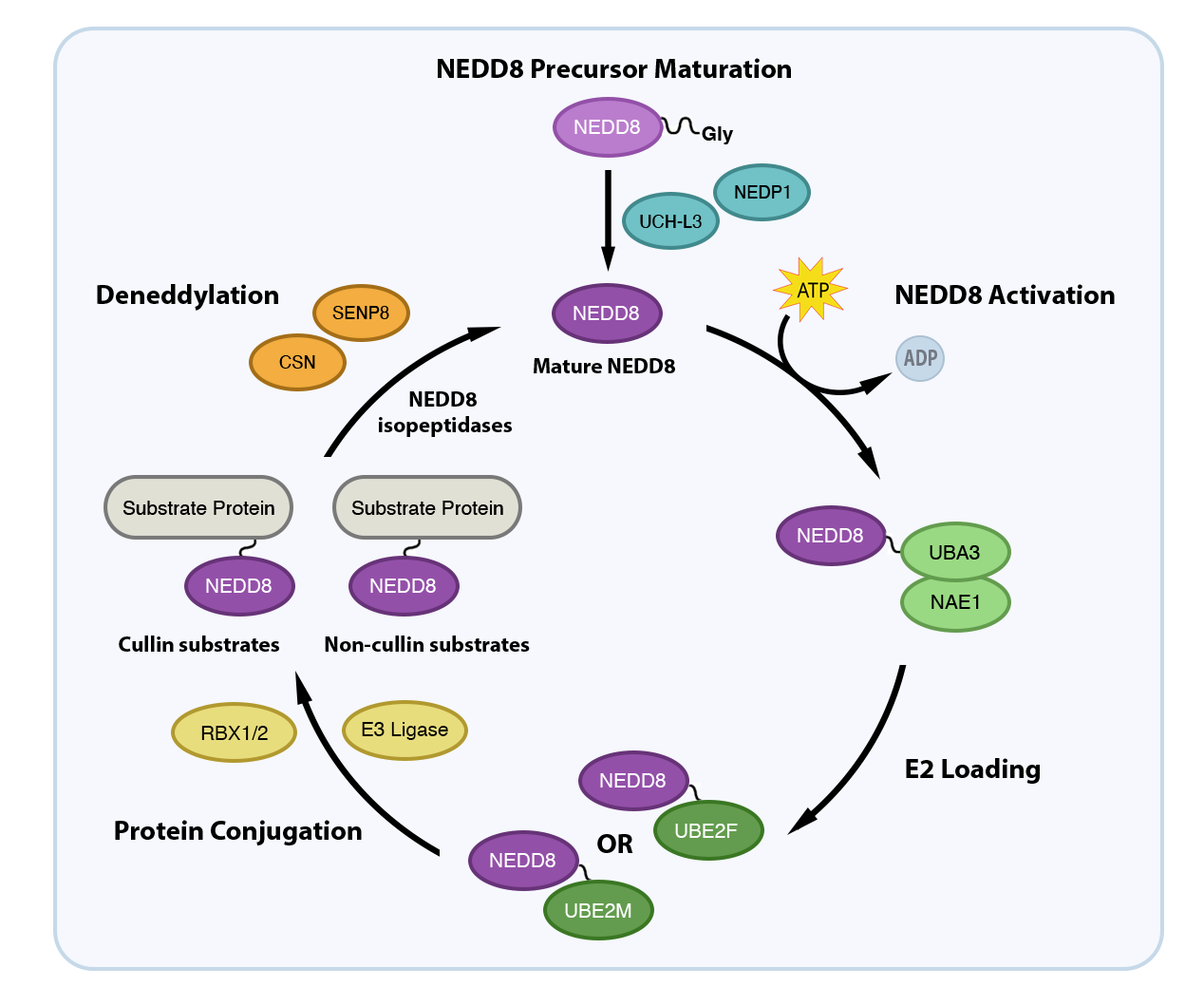
- Post-translational modification in which NEDD8 is covalently attached to lysine residues via reactions catalyzed by multiple proteins.

Biochemical Reaction
- Part of: Cell
- Located: Nucleus, Cytoplasm
- Category: Post-translational modification
- Type: Protein-conjugating

Central Functions
- Regulation of Glucose & Lipid Metabolism Immunoregulation & Modulation of Immune Cells Regulation of Protein Degradation Pathways Neurogenesis & Nervous System Development

Key Enzymes
- NEDD8, UCH-L3, NEDP1 UBA3, NAE1, UBE2M/UBE2F NEDD8 E3 Ligases

Discovered
1997	Tetsu Kamitani & Colleagues; Discover protein neddylation for the first time
2009	Yu Ohki & Colleagues; Discover protein poly-neddylation for the first time
2013	Teng Ma & Colleagues; Discover histone neddylation for the first time
2013	Teng Ma & Colleagues; Discover histone poly-neddylation for the first time
- Category

Protein neddylation refers to the post-translational modification in which ubiquitin-like protein NEDD8 is covalently attached to the lysine residue of a target protein, which is catalyzed by a cascade of enzymes including UBA3, NAE1, UBE2M or UBE2F, and NEDD8 E3 ligases. Neddylation belongs to the overall class of protein-conjugating post-translational modifications, which includes other reactions such as ubiquitination, SUMOylation, and ISGylation.

Neddylation has been reported for both histone and non-histone protein substrates, and thus represents a distinct epigenetic and proteomic regulatory mechanism with various implications in health and disease. Recent studies have unveiled the critical role of neddylation in mediating a wide range of physiological processes, in both the nervous system and beyond.

Neddylation is known to contribute to several significant diseases, including metabolic disorders, neurodegenerative diseases, and various cancers. To date, the best characterized protein substrates of neddylation belong to the cullin protein family (CUL), where neddylation is known to activate cullin RING ligases (CRLs).

Roles for protein neddylation have been reported for several neurological diseases, including ischemia, multiple sclerosis, Parkinson's disease, epilepsy, amyotrophic lateral sclerosis, Alzheimer's disease, and hereditary spastic paraplegia. Overactive neddylation is known to influence both tumorigenesis and cancer metastasis, as well as therapeutic resistance (ie., to cancer treatment).

== Identification ==
Protein neddylation was first identified in 1997 by Tetsu Kamitani and colleagues at the University of Texas. In their characterization of Neural Precursor Cell Expressed Developmentally Downregulated Protein 8 (NEDD8), the group hypothesized that NEDD8 was likely to be conjugated to other proteins in a manner analogous to ubiquitination.

Over ten years after the discovery of protein neddylation, protein poly-neddylation was identified for the first time, when Yu Ohki and colleagues at the University of Tsukuba revealed the mechanism of poly-NEDD8 chain formation (or poly-neddylation) in vitro.

Notably, histone neddylation was not uncovered as an epigenetic regulatory mechanism until 2013, when Teng Ma and colleagues at the University of Michigan Medical School reported the H4-neddylation modification for the first time. Herein, the group was also the first to report histone poly-neddylation, which was found on histone H4.

== Mechanism ==
Neddylation is catalyzed by an enzymatic cascade not unlike that of ubiquitination. Several categories of proteins are necessary to complete the multi-step process of neddylation, which begins with NEDD8 maturation, followed by its activation, protein conjugation, and ultimate ligation. Generally, protein neddylation occurs in both the cytoplasm (ie., for cullins) and the nucleus (ie., for transcription factors); however, histone neddylation only occurs within the nucleus.

Interestingly, all NEDD8 genes encode a non-conjugatable precursor protein containing one or more additional C-terminal glycine residues beyond that of the mature, conjugatable NEDD8 protein. Thus, neddylation begins with the maturation of the NEDD8 precursor protein, wherein all additional glycine residues beyond that of Gly 76 are cleaved in reactions catalyzed by C-terminal hydrolases. As such, UCH-L3 and NEDP1 proteolytically cleave the excess C-terminal glycine residues of the precursor to expose the Gly-Gly motif of the NEDD8 protein, thereby rendering it fully mature.

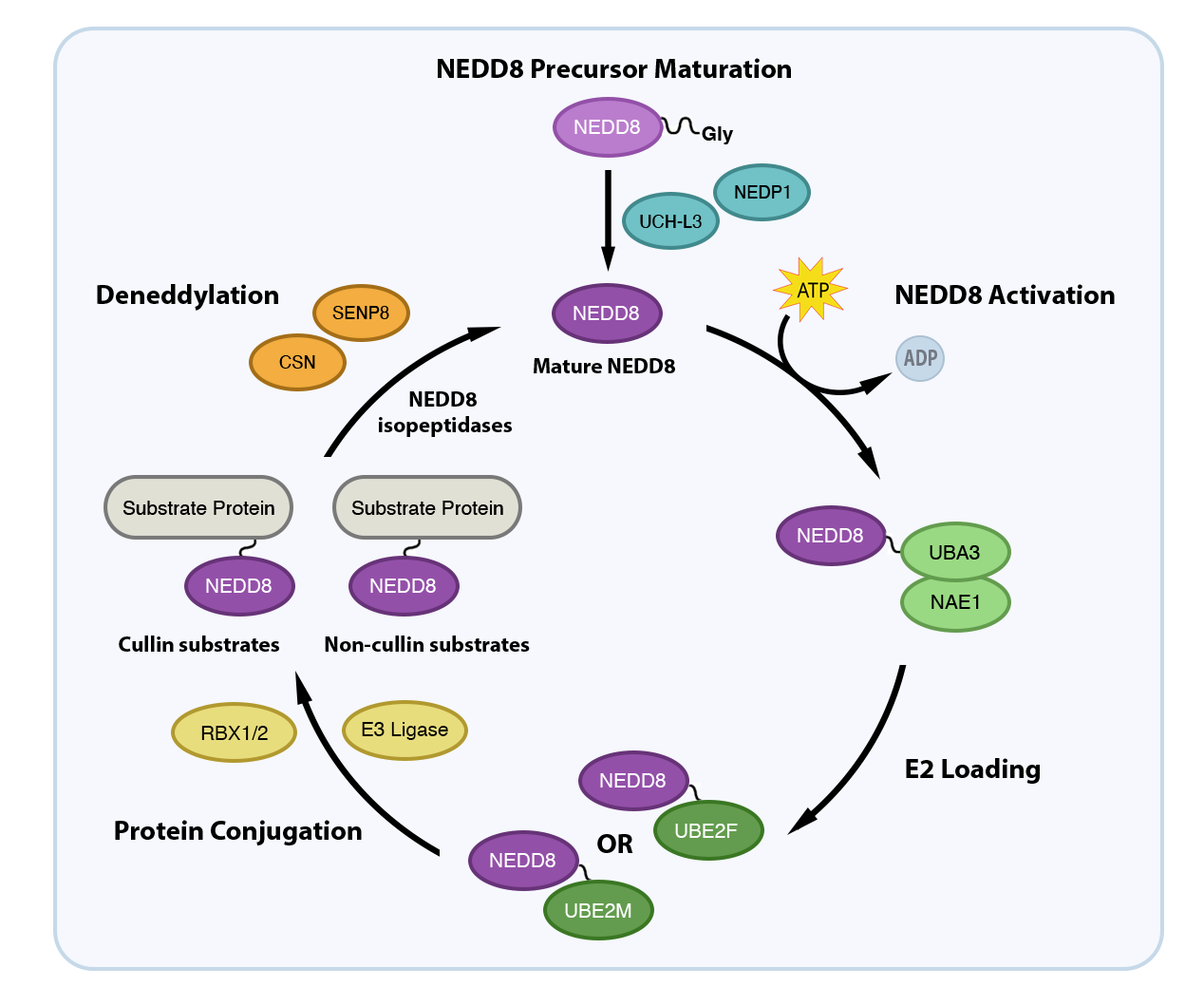

Fig. 1 Mechanism for Protein Neddylation
Neddylation is a multi-step process which begins with the maturation NEDD8 precursor protein, which is catalyzed by UCH-L3 and NEDP1. Mature NEDD8 is then activated by the E1 UBA3/NAE1 heterodimer, in a reaction that requires both Mg^{2+} and a molecule of ATP. Next, NEDD8 is transferred from the E1 UBA3/NAE1 activating complex to one of two E2 conjugating enzymes (UBE2M or UBE2F) via transthiolation. Finally, NEDD8 is covalently attached to the lysine residue of substrate proteins by NEDD8 E3 ligases. As such, RBX1/2 catalyze the neddylation of Cullin substrates, while other NEDD8 E3 ligases (denoted here as E3 Ligase) catalyze the neddylation of non-cullin substrates.

To activate mature NEDD8 for protein conjugation, the E1 enzyme NAE1 forms a heterodimer with UBA3 and catalyzes a two-step reaction: (1) acyl-adenylation at the C-terminus of NEDD8, and (2) formation of a high-energy thioester bond between activated NEDD8 and NAE1. Notably, this catalytic process requires one molecule of ATP and sufficient intracellular Mg^{2+} concentrations in order to occur. Thereafter, activated NEDD8 is transferred from the E1 activating complex (UBA3/NAE1) to one of two specific E2 conjugating enzymes (UBE2M or UBE2F) via an E1-catalyzed E2 transthiolation reaction.

Finally, conjugation of NEDD8 to the lysine residue of target proteins is catalyzed by NEDD8 E3 ligases, which are responsible for both NEDD8 positioning and recognition of the substrate protein. In recent years, a growing number of NEDD8 E3 ligases have been described, including RBX1/2, MDM2, FBXO11, RNF111, RanBP2, and TRIM40 among others. RBX1 and RBX2 act as substrate-specific NEDD8 E3 ligases, where RBX1 is known to catalyze the neddylation of Cullin1-4 while RBX2 is only known to catalyze that of Cullin5. It is likely that greater substrate specificity exists among the E3 ligases catalyzing non-cullin protein neddylation, as has recently been the case for CBLb-mediated neddylation of PARP-1. To date, notable non-cullin neddylation substrates include signaling molecules such as tumor suppressors TP53 and TP73, E2F transcription factors, epidermal growth factor receptor (EGFR), transforming growth factor-β type II receptor (TGFβRII), and NF-κB essential modulator (NEMO).

Deneddylation is carried out by NEDD8 isopeptidases (also known as "deneddylases"), which remove NEDD8 from the lysine residue of the target protein. To date, known deneddylases include the constitutive photomorphogenesis 9 (COP9) signalosome (CSN), NEDD8 protease 1 (NEDP1/DEN1/SENP8), USP21, and UCH-L3. Notably, in addition to orchestrating the deneddylation of target proteins, UCH-L3 and NEDP1 also participate in the maturation of the NEDD8 precursor protein via their C-terminal hydrolase activity.

== Disease association ==
Neddylation is essential for human cells, but it becomes aberrant in many pathological processes, such as cancer, neurodegenerative disorders and metabolic diseases.

Neddylation is involved in the pathogenesis of Alzheimer's disease where its activation appears to drive neurons into apoptosis by initiating cell cycle reentry. Also, evidence suggests that increased NEDD8 conjugation in human oral carcinoma cells leads to abnormal, higher degrees of proliferation. Because NEDD8 conjugation to cullin proteins plays an important role in the regulation of the cell cycle, an upregulation in conjugation causes this proliferation.

Neddylation is also involved in cancer. Higher levels of NEDD8 are found in tumor tissues compared to their normal healthy counterparts, and this is associated with worse prognosis and advanced stages in many cancer types. Due to the clear correlation between abnormal neddylation and cancer, a neddylation inhibitor was developed. Pevonedistat or MLN4929 is the first neddylation E1 inhibitor being tested for several clinical trials in cancer patients, both as a monotherapy and in combination with other therapies.
