= Yi Sun =

Yi Sun may refer to:

- Sukjong of Joseon (1661–1720), personal name Yi Sun
- Sun Yi (actress) (born 1993), Chinese actress
- Yi Sun (academic)
- Yi Sun (consultant) (born 1975)
