= CCDC198 =

Protein-coding gene in humans

Identifiers
- Aliases: CCDC198, C14orf105, chromosome 14 open reading frame 105, coiled-coil domain containing 198, FLJ10650
- External IDs: MGI: 1914332; HomoloGene: 49528; GeneCards: CCDC198; OMA:CCDC198 - orthologs

Gene location (Human)
Chr.	Chromosome 14 (human)
Band	14q22.3	Start	57,469,300 bp
Band	14q22.3	End	57,493,867 bp

Gene location (Mouse)
Chr.	Chromosome 14 (mouse)
Band	14|14 C1	Start	49,457,045 bp
Band	14|14 C1	End	49,482,931 bp
RNA expression pattern
Bgee	Human / Mouse (ortholog); Top expressed in: right uterine tube; body of pancreas; right lobe of liver; renal medulla; gallbladder; human kidney; buccal mucosa cell; kidney tubule; caput epididymis; testicle / Top expressed in: right kidney; epithelium of small intestine; renal pelvis; human kidney; spermatid; migratory enteric neural crest cell; proximal tubule; seminiferous tubule; efferent ductule; renal calyx; More reference expression data
BioGPS	n/a
Orthologs
Species	Human	Mouse
Entrez	55195	67082
Ensembl	ENSG00000100557	ENSMUSG00000021850
UniProt	Q9NVL8	Q9CPZ1
RefSeq (mRNA)	NM_001283056; NM_001283057; NM_001283058; NM_001283059; NM_001283060 NM_018168	NM_025956
RefSeq (protein)	NP_001269985; NP_001269986; NP_001269987; NP_001269988; NP_001269989 NP_060638; NP_001269985.1	NP_080232
Location (UCSC)	Chr 14: 57.47 – 57.49 Mb	Chr 14: 49.46 – 49.48 Mb
PubMed search
- Wikidata
View/Edit Human	View/Edit Mouse

Coiled-Coil Domain Containing 198 (CCDC198) is a gene that encodes for a protein of the same name.

== Bioinformation ==
=== Gene ===
The gene spans 24,570 bp on human chromosome 14.

=== Transcript ===
Isoform X2 of CCDC198 is 999 nucleotides long. CCDC198 is notably expressed in both the liver and the kidney.

=== Protein ===
CCDC198 has 296 amino acids and a molecular mass of 34.7 kilodaltons.

== Phylogeny ==
The gene is confined within animals, as confident orthologs in fungi and choanoflagellates were not found. The human gene shares defined homology with placental mammals, marsupials, monotremes, reptiles, birds, amphibians, cartilaginous fish and some homology in insects, lobe finned fish, chelicerates and corals (Figure 22). The following significant taxonomic groups do not yield confident homology: nematodes, cnidaria, platyhelminths, porifera, annelids, ctenophora, mollusca, echinodermata, myriapoda, agnatha, tunicata. Crustacea is a borderline case that may yield homology. It is notable that there is a sharp cut off in sequence similarity outside of mammals, and a sharp drop in ortholog frequency outside of amniotes.

== Expression ==
CCDC198 is primarily expressed in the kidneys, liver and pancreas, and also shows minor but significant expression in the fallopian tubes based on general NCBI profile data. Based on NCBI GEO microarray data on diverse cell tissue, it is expressed in the bladder, lung, midgut, gallbladder and fallopian tube as well, with minor expression in the testis and prostate.

== Relation with ubiquitin-related modifier 1 ==
An antibody has been developed to CCDC198 protein by Sigma-Aldrich. Known as Anti-C14orf105 or Anti-FLJ10650, it is synonymous with Anti-C9orf74, an antibody for the characterized Ubiquitin-related modifier 1 gene

== Clinical significance ==
The X12 isoform of CCDC198 has proposed as a potential marker of infection by the liver fluke Opisthorchis viverrini Though normally expressed even in healthy individuals, CCDC198 has a threefold abundance in infected individuals. CCDC198 has more significant expression in those afflicted by alcoholic hepatitis.
