= NAE1 =

Protein-coding gene in humans

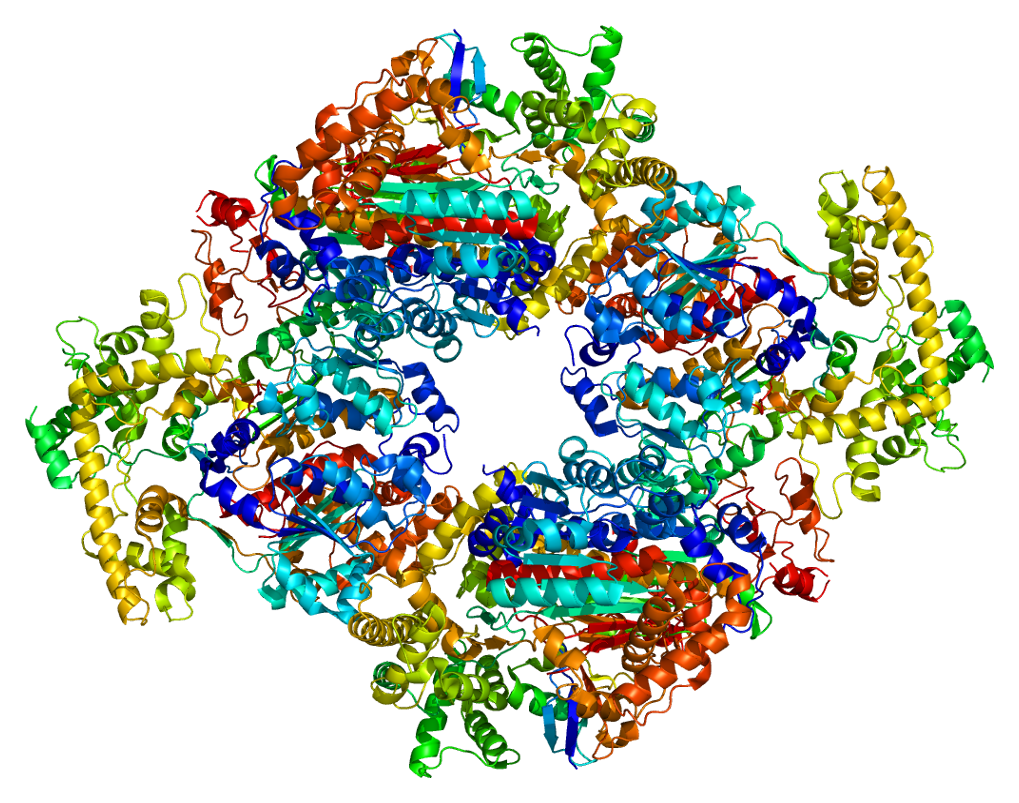

Identifiers
- Aliases: NAE1, A-116A10.1, APPBP1, ula-1, HPP1, NEDD8 activating enzyme E1 subunit 1
- External IDs: OMIM: 603385; MGI: 2384561; GeneCards: NAE1
Available structures
PDB	Ortholog search: PDBe RCSB
PDB	List of PDB id codes 1R4M, 1R4N, 1TT5, 1YOV, 2NVU, 3DBH, 3DBL, 3DBR, 3GZN

Gene location (Human)
Chr.	Chromosome 16 (human)
Band	16q22.1	Start	66,802,875 bp
Band	16q22.1	End	66,873,256 bp

Gene location (Mouse)
Chr.	Chromosome 8 (mouse)
Band	8|8 D3	Start	105,237,660 bp
Band	8|8 D3	End	105,261,269 bp
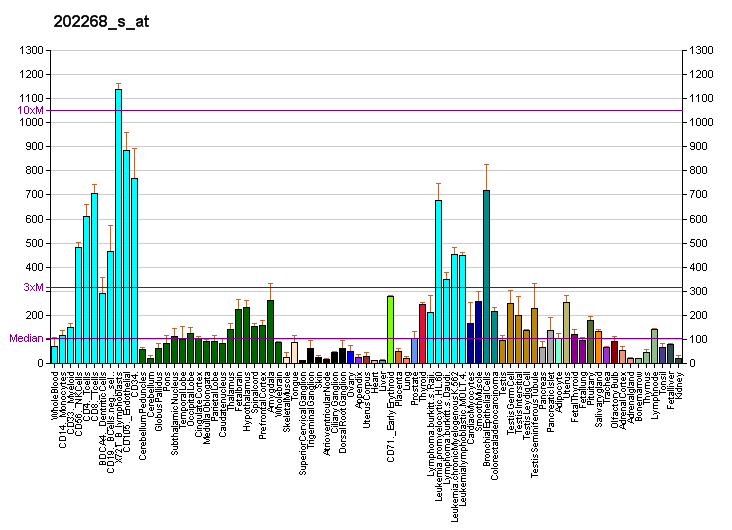
RNA expression pattern
Bgee	Human / Mouse (ortholog); Top expressed in: secondary oocyte; gonad; Achilles tendon; ventricular zone; testicle; cerebellar hemisphere; right hemisphere of cerebellum; ganglionic eminence; tibia; skin of hip / Top expressed in: primitive streak; spermatocyte; ciliary body; medial ganglionic eminence; Gonadal ridge; iris; abdominal wall; mandibular prominence; maxillary prominence; vestibular sensory epithelium; More reference expression data
BioGPS	More reference expression data
Gene ontology
Molecular function	NEDD8 activating enzyme activity; protein binding; ubiquitin-like modifier activating enzyme activity; ubiquitin protein ligase binding; protein heterodimerization activity
Cellular component	cytoplasm; plasma membrane; membrane; cytosol; protein-containing complex
Biological process	regulation of apoptotic process; neuron apoptotic process; cell cycle; protein neddylation; regulation of neuron apoptotic process; mitotic DNA replication checkpoint signaling; signal transduction; apoptotic process; post-translational protein modification; protein modification by small protein conjugation
Sources:Amigo / QuickGO
Orthologs
Databases	NCBI: entry; OMA: entry
Species	Human	Mouse
Entrez	8883	234664
Ensembl	ENSG00000159593	ENSMUSG00000031878
UniProt	Q13564	Q8VBW6
RefSeq (mRNA)	NM_001018159; NM_001018160; NM_001286500; NM_003905	NM_144931
RefSeq (protein)	NP_001018169; NP_001018170; NP_001273429; NP_003896	NP_659180
Location (UCSC)	Chr 16: 66.8 – 66.87 Mb	Chr 8: 105.24 – 105.26 Mb
PubMed search
- Wikidata
View/Edit Human	View/Edit Mouse

NEDD8-activating enzyme E1 regulatory subunit is a protein that in humans is encoded by the NAE1 gene (previously APPBP1).

== Function ==
The protein encoded by this gene binds to the beta-amyloid precursor protein. Beta-amyloid precursor protein is a cell surface protein with signal-transducing properties, and it is thought to play a role in the pathogenesis of Alzheimer's disease. In addition, the encoded protein can form a heterodimer with UBE1C and bind and activate NEDD8, a ubiquitin-like protein. This protein is required for cell cycle progression through the S/M checkpoint. Three transcript variants encoding different isoforms have been found for this gene.

APPBP1 (Amyloid Precursor Protein-Binding Protein 1) binds to the Amyloid Precursor Protein (APP) carboxy terminal domain. APPBP1 is a multi-functional protein with activities in neuronal tissues. APPBP1 also bonds with UBA3 (ubiquitin-like protein-activating enzyme 3) to form the NEDD8 activating enzyme (NAE). Activated NEDD8 is an enzyme that regulates multiple cellular pathways.

== History ==
APPBP1 was first cloned and identified by its interaction with the C-terminus of beta-amyloid protein precursor (precursor to beta-amyloid present in Alzheimer's disease) in 1996. APPBP1 was first studied for its potential neuronal effects, and neuronal effects continue to be further investigated (e.g. references).

== Role in NEDD8 activation ==
APPBP1 can bind to UBA3 to form the NEDD8 activating enzyme (NAE) (homologous to the ubiquitin-activating enzymes, also known as E1 enzymes). When NEDD8 is activated it can neddylate (and thereby alter the activity of) target proteins. Neddylation has emerged as a major regulatory pathway with a critical role, among others, in cell cycle progression and survival. Proteins that are neddylated include the DNA replication licensing factor Cdt-1, the NF-κB transcription factor inhibitor pIκBα, and the cell cycle regulators cyclin E and p27. Thus, APPBP1 carries out an initiating step that controls major regulatory pathways in the cell.

The first step in activation of NEDD8 by NAE is the extensive interaction of the acidic face of NEDD8’s globular domain with the catalytic cysteine domain portion of the APPBP1 component of NAE. The interface between NEDD8 and APPBP1 involves the helix and subsequent loop in NEDD8 and a sub-domain comprising APPBP1’s residues 178–280 that serves as a wall for the broad, deep groove in the APPBP1-UBA3 structure. The nature of this interface is predominantly polar, with 11 residues from NEDD8 forming a network of hydrogen bonds and salt bridges with 9 residues from the APPBP1 component of NAE.

Subsequent activation steps were described by Walden et al., and Schulman. NEDD8 interacts with an adenylation pocket of the UBA3 part of the heterodimeric NAE to form covalently linked NEDD8-AMP. NEDD8 then forms a covalent thioester bond with a reactive cysteine of the UBA3 part of NAE. After this, a second NEDD8 is attracted to APPBP1 followed by adenylation in the UBA3 adenylation pocket. The activated NAE is thus loaded with two NEDD8 molecules asymmetrically arranged.

== Role in DNA repair ==
After activation of NEDD8, initiated by APPBP1, NEDD8 interaction at DNA-damage sites is a highly dynamic process. Neddylation is needed during a short period of the global genome repair (GGR) sub-pathway of DNA nucleotide excision repair (NER). When DNA damage is produced by UV irradiation, CUL4A in the DNA damage binding protein 2 (DDB2) complex is activated by NEDD8, and this activated complex allows GGR-NER to proceed to remove the damage.

Neddylation also has a role in repair of double-strand breaks. Non-homologous end joining(NHEJ) is a DNA repair pathway frequently used to repair DNA double-strand breaks. The first step in this pathway depends on the Ku70/Ku80 heterodimer that forms a highly stable ring structure encircling DNA ends. But the Ku heterodimer needs to be removed when NHEJ is completed, or it can block transcription or replication. The Ku heterodimer is ubiquitylated in a DNA-damage and neddylation-dependent manner to promote the release of Ku and other NHEJ factors from the site of repair after the process is completed.

== Role in cancer therapy ==
When APPBP1 complexes with UBA3 to form the NEDD8 activating enzyme (NAE), it changes the conformation of UBA3 from the free form to a form that can carry out the cascade of actions needed to activate NEDD8. The adenylation pocket of UBA3 in the hetero-dimeric NAE enzyme is critical for NEDD8 activation.

Pevonedistat (MLN4924) is an analog of adenosine sulfamate.

Pevonedistat is a mechanism-based inhibitor of NAE. NAE catalyzes formation of a covalent NEDD8-Pevonedistat adduct. The covalent NEDD8-Pevonedistat adduct occupies the same sites as ATP and NEDD8 bound in the adenylation active site in the NAE structure. The NEDD8-Pevonedistat adduct resembles NEDD8 adenylate, the first intermediate in the NAE reaction cycle, but cannot be further utilized in subsequent intraenzyme reactions. The stability of the NEDD8-Pevonedistat adduct within the NAE active site blocks enzyme activity, thereby accounting for the potent inhibition of the NEDD8 pathway by Pevonedistat.

As described above, activated NEDD8 is needed for at least two pathways of DNA repair, nucleotide excision repair (NER) and non-homologous end joining (NHEJ) (see NEDD8).

One or more DNA repair genes in seven DNA repair pathways are frequently epigenetically silenced in cancers (see e.g. DNA repair pathways).) This is a likely source of the genome instability of cancers. If activation of NEDD8 is inhibited by Pevonedistat, cancer cells will then have an additional induced deficiency of NER or NHEJ. Such cells may then die because of deficient DNA repair leading to accumulation of DNA damages. The effect of NEDD8 inhibition may be greater for cancer cells than for normal cells if the cancer cells are already deficient in DNA repair due to prior epigenetic silencing of DNA repair genes active in alternative pathways (see synthetic lethality).

== Clinical trials ==
In a phase 1 trial of Pevonedistat to determine dosing in patients with AML and myelodysplastic syndromes "modest clinical activity was observed".

More recently, in 2016, Pevonedistat has shown a significant therapeutic effect in three further Phase I clinical cancer trials. These include Pevonedistat trials against relapsed/refractory multiple myeloma or lymphoma, metastatic melanoma, and advanced solid tumors.

== Interactions ==
APPBP1 has been shown to interact with UBE1C, TRIP12 and Amyloid precursor protein.
