= NUB1 =

Protein-coding gene in the species Homo sapiens

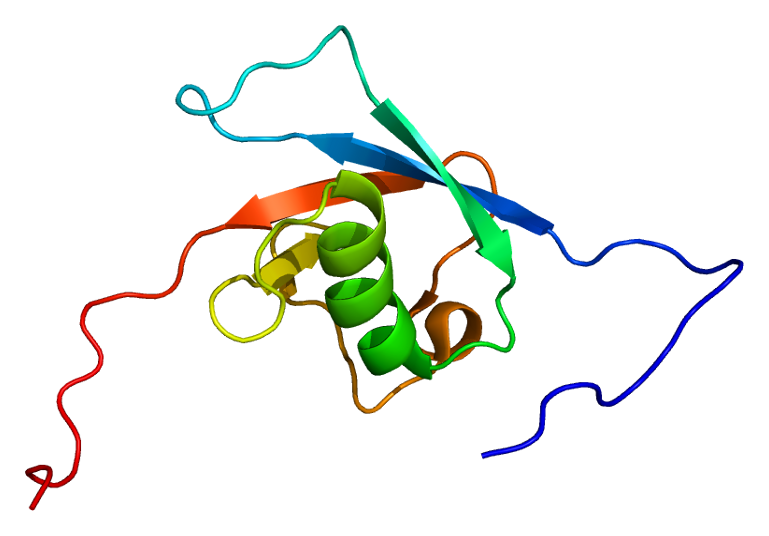
Available structures
| PDB | Ortholog search: PDBe RCSB |
| PDB | List of PDB id codes 1WJU |

Identifiers
- Aliases: NUB1, BS4, NUB1L, NYREN18, negative regulator of ubiquitin-like proteins 1, negative regulator of ubiquitin like proteins 1
- External IDs: OMIM: 607981; MGI: 1889001; HomoloGene: 41108; GeneCards: NUB1; OMA:NUB1 - orthologs

Gene location (Human)
| Chr. | Chromosome 7 (human) |
| Band | 7q36.1 | Start | 151,341,772 bp |
| Band | 7q36.1 | End | 151,378,449 bp |

Gene location (Mouse)
| Chr. | Chromosome 5 (mouse) |
| Band | 5|5 A3 | Start | 24,890,530 bp |
| Band | 5|5 A3 | End | 24,915,376 bp |
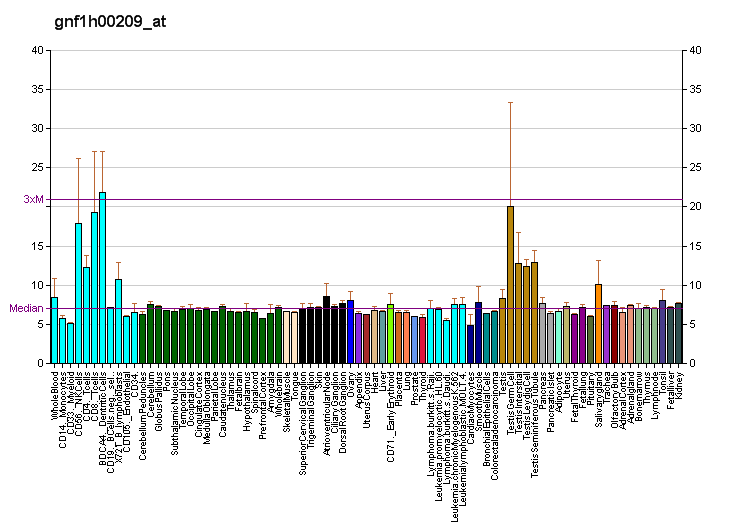
RNA expression pattern
| Bgee | Human / Mouse (ortholog); Top expressed in: Achilles tendon; mucosa of ileum; tibia; monocyte; visceral pleura; tendon of biceps brachii; appendix; parietal pleura; islet of Langerhans; rectum / Top expressed in: morula; granulocyte; seminiferous tubule; dentate gyrus of hippocampal formation granule cell; muscle of thigh; superior frontal gyrus; neural layer of retina; primary visual cortex; spermatid; blastocyst; More reference expression data |
| BioGPS | More reference expression data |
Gene ontology
| Molecular function | protein binding |
| Cellular component | nucleus; cytosol; nucleolus |
| Biological process | response to tumor necrosis factor; response to interferon-gamma; positive regulation of proteasomal ubiquitin-dependent protein catabolic process; ubiquitin-dependent protein catabolic process; protein ubiquitination; post-translational protein modification |
Sources:Amigo / QuickGO
Orthologs
| Species | Human | Mouse |
| Entrez | 51667 | 53312 |
| Ensembl | ENSG00000013374 | ENSMUSG00000028954 |
| UniProt | Q9Y5A7 | P54729 |
| RefSeq (mRNA) | NM_001243351; NM_016118; NM_001363529; NM_001385353; NM_001385354 NM_001385355; NM_001385356; NM_001385361 | NM_016736; NM_001305264 |
| RefSeq (protein) | NP_001230280; NP_057202; NP_001350458 | NP_001292193; NP_058016 |
| Location (UCSC) | Chr 7: 151.34 – 151.38 Mb | Chr 5: 24.89 – 24.92 Mb |
| PubMed search |
- Wikidata
| View/Edit Human | View/Edit Mouse |

NEDD8 ultimate buster 1 is a protein that in humans is encoded by the NUB1 gene.

== Function ==
NUB1 interacts with and negatively regulates NEDD8 (MIM 603171), a ubiquitin-like protein that covalently conjugates to cullin (see MIM 603134) family members.[supplied by OMIM]

== Interactions ==
NUB1 has been shown to interact with NEDD8, UBD and AIPL1.
