= Yi Sun (academic) =

Chinese-American academic

- Occupations: Biologist, Oncologist

Academic background
- Education: M.D. M.S. I. Biochemistry; Ph.D. in Radiation biology
- Alma mater: Jiangxi Medical College; Zhejiang University School of Medicine; University of Iowa

Academic work
- Institutions: Institute of Translational Medicine of Zhejiang University

Yi Sun (Chinese: 孙毅) is an American scientist of Chinese origin. He is a molecular biologist and oncologist, and his research is focused on how altered protein Ubiquitylation and Neddylation contribute to cancer development. Sun is a Professor Emeritus of Radiation Oncology at the University of Michigan.

Sun is the Qiushi Chair Professor at the second Affiliated Hospital and Institute of Translational Medicine, Zhejiang University School of Medicine in China. Sun has been a fellow of the American Association for the Advancement of Science since 2012.

== Career and education ==
In 1982, Sun obtained his M.D. degree at Jiangxi Medical College, Nanchang, China, and continued to Zhejiang University's School of Medicine, where he had his M.S. in biochemistry in 1985. He moved to the United States in 1986 and obtained his PhD in Radiation biology from the University of Iowa in 1989. Sun spent five years at the National Cancer Institute as a post doctoral fellow, later as a senior staff fellow from 1990 to 1995.

Sun then spent 8 years in Parke-Davis/Pfizer as research fellow for cancer target identification and drug discovery in Ann Arbor, Michigan. He then joined the faculty of University of Michigan in 2003, and was promoted to full-time professor and Director of the Division of Radiation and Cancer Biology in 2008.

Sun retired in 2020.

== Research ==
Sun has research expertise in cancer biology, radiation oncology, and translational medicine, specialized in protein ubiquitylation and neddylation, and their role in cancer.

=== SAG/RBX2 E3 ligase is a validated anti-cancer target ===
Sun cloned SAG (Sensitive to Apoptosis Gene), also known as RBX2, as an antioxidant protein, and a RING component of Cullin-RING ubiquitin ligases (CRLs), required for their activities; He and his team discovered that Sag is essential for mouse development, as well as for angiogenesis and apoptosis protection. The team validated SAG as a target for anti-cancer drug discovery by demonstrating its promoting role during tumorigenesis in the lung, prostate, and pancreas; and its overexpression in human cancer tissues with positive correlation to poor survival of cancer patients.

=== SAG-CRLs regulates many important biological processes via targeting degradation of key proteins ===
Sun and his team identified a number of key regulatory proteins as the substrates of CRLs that control a variety of important signal pathways and biological processes, particularly in growth and survival of cancer cells. These substrates include DEPTOR, XRCC4, SHOC2, SKP2, β-Catenin, MSX2, Nf1, c-Jun, IκBα, Erbin, NOXA, ASCT2, and DIRAS-2, as well as procaspase-3, HIF-1α, p27, MFN1, and EGR1. Targeted inhibition of CRLs causes accumulation of the tumor suppressors to inhibit cancer cell growth and cancer development.

=== Elucide neddylation function and discover neddylation inhibitors as novel anticancer agents ===
Sun and his team showed a cross-talk between two neddylation E2s, and neddylation E2/E3 regulated the functions of immune cells. The team also found that E1 inhibitor MLN4924 sensitizes pancreatic cancer cells to radiation; regulates stem cell proliferation and differentiation; and strikingly suppressed tumorigenesis in the lung and pancreas, triggered by mutant KrasG12D as a single agent. The study in the lung tumorigenesis triggered an intensive collaboration with Takeda Pharmaceutics, Inc., leading to an investigator-initiated Phase II clinical trials of MLN4924 (also known as pevonedistat) plus Docetaxel in patients with previously treated advanced non-small cell lung cancer. In drug discovery side, Sun and his collaborators discovered small molecule inhibitors of neddylation E1, neddylation E2 UBE2F and UBE2M-DCN interactions.

== Selected publications ==
- Tan, M., Zhao, Y., Kim, S. J., Liu, M., Jia, L., Saunders, T. L., Zhu, Y., & Sun, Y. (2011). SAG/RBX2/ROC2 E3 ubiquitin ligase is essential for vascular and neural development by targeting NF1 for degradation. Developmental cell, 21(6), 1062–1076. https://doi.org/10.1016/j.devcel.2011.09.014
- Zhao, Y., Xiong, X., & Sun, Y. (2020). Cullin-RING Ligase 5: Functional characterization and its role in human cancers. Seminars in cancer biology, 67(Pt 2), 61–79. https://doi.org/10.1016/j.semcancer.2020.04.003
- Li, H., Tan, M., Jia, L., Wei, D., Zhao, Y., Chen, G., Xu, J., Zhao, L., Thomas, D., Beer, D. G., & Sun, Y. (2014). Inactivation of SAG/RBX2 E3 ubiquitin ligase suppresses KrasG12D-driven lung tumorigenesis. The Journal of clinical investigation, 124(2), 835–846. https://doi.org/10.1172/JCI70297
- Zhao, Y., Xiong, X., & Sun, Y. (2011). DEPTOR, an mTOR inhibitor, is a physiological substrate of SCF(βTrCP) E3 ubiquitin ligase and regulates survival and autophagy. Molecular cell, 44(2), 304–316. https://doi.org/10.1016/j.molcel.2011.08.029
- Zhang, Q., Karnak, D., Tan, M., Lawrence, T. S., Morgan, M. A., & Sun, Y. (2016). FBXW7 Facilitates Nonhomologous End-Joining via K63-Linked Polyubiquitylation of XRCC4. Molecular cell, 61(3), 419–433. https://doi.org/10.1016/j.molcel.2015.12.010
- Zhou, W., Xu, J., Tan, M., Li, H., Li, H., Wei, W., & Sun, Y. (2018). UBE2M Is a Stress-Inducible Dual E2 for Neddylation and Ubiquitylation that Promotes Targeted Degradation of UBE2F. Molecular cell, 70(6), 1008–1024.e6. https://doi.org/10.1016/j.molcel.2018.06.002
- Zhang, S., You, X., Zheng, Y., Shen, Y., Xiong, X., & Sun, Y. (2023). The UBE2C/CDH1/DEPTOR axis is an oncogene and tumor suppressor cascade in lung cancer cells. The Journal of clinical investigation, 133(4), e162434. https://doi.org/10.1172/JCI162434
- Zhou, Q^{#}., Yu, H^{#}., Chen, Y., Ren, J., Lu, Y., and Sun, Y. (2024) The CRL3^{KCTD10} ubiquitin ligase-USP18 axis coordinately regulates cystine uptake and ferroptosis by modulating SLC7A11. PNAS, 121(28):e2320655121. https://doi.org/10.1073/pnas.2320655121
- Zhang, F. Wang, H., Xiong, X., Zhao, Y., and Sun, Y. (2025) RHEB neddylation by the UBE2F-SAG axis enhances mTORC1 activity and aggravates liver tumorigenesis. EMBO J., 44: 1185-1219. https://doi.org/10.1038/s44318-024-00353-5
- Yin, L., Zhang, J., Zhu, Z., Peng, X., Lan, H., Ayoub, A., Tan, M., Zhou, B., He, Y., Wang, S., Lu, Y., Liu, W., Xiong, X., Huang, J., Dou, Y., Mao, F., and Sun, Y. (2025) The FBXW7-KMT2 axis in cancer-associated fibroblasts control the tumor growth via an epigenetic-paracrine mechanism. PNAS, 122(13):e2423130122. https://doi.org/10.1073/pnas.2423130122
- Yu, Q., Zhang, S., Li, Z., Liang, T., and Sun, Y. (2026) SAG/RBX2/ROC2/RNF7 dual E3 ligase: From target identification, validation to drug discovery. BBA Reviews on Cancer, https://doi.org/10.1016/j.bbcan.2026.189546
- Zhang, S., Lan, H., and Sun, Y. (2026) Protein neddylation as a therapeutic target: Challenges and Opportunities. J Clin Invest., 2026 Aug 3;136(15):e206924. https://doi.org/10.1172/jci206924
