= UBE2M =

Protein-coding gene in the species Homo sapiens

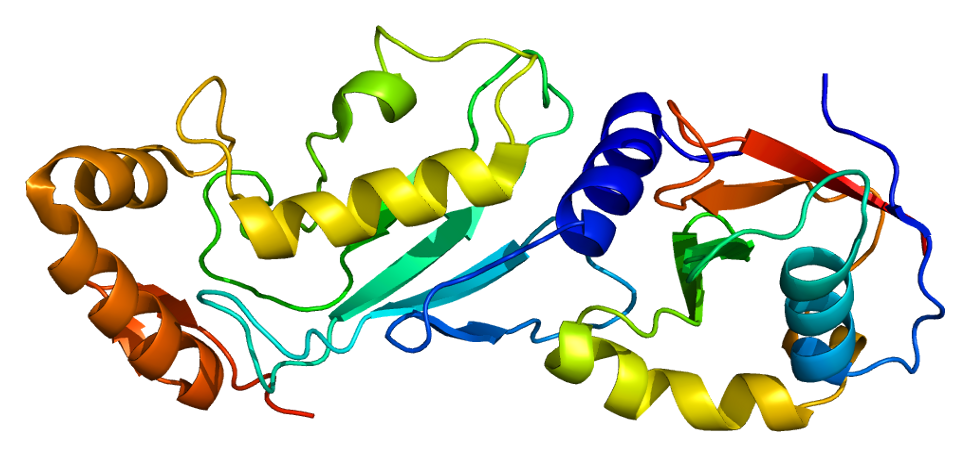

Identifiers
- Aliases: UBE2M, UBC-RS2, UBC12, hUbc12, ubiquitin conjugating enzyme E2 M
- External IDs: OMIM: 603173; MGI: 108278; GeneCards: UBE2M
Available structures
PDB	Ortholog search: PDBe RCSB
PDB	List of PDB id codes 1TT5, 1Y8X, 2NVU, 3TDU, 3TDZ, 4GAO, 4P5O
Enzyme activity
EC #	BRENDA	ExPASy	KEGG	MetaCyc
2.3.2.34	↗	↗	↗	↗

Gene location (Human)
Chr.	Chromosome 19 (human)
Band	19q13.43	Start	58,555,712 bp
Band	19q13.43	End	58,558,954 bp

Gene location (Mouse)
Chr.	Chromosome 7 (mouse)
Band	7 A1|7 7.73 cM	Start	12,769,047 bp
Band	7 A1|7 7.73 cM	End	12,772,202 bp
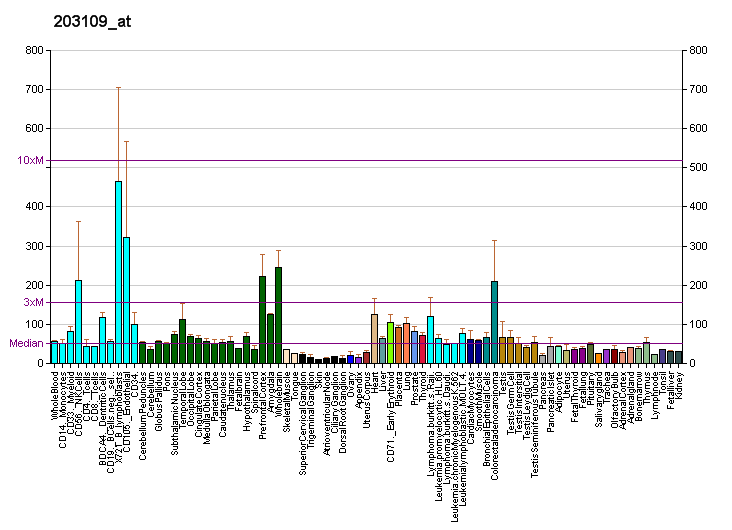
RNA expression pattern
Bgee	Human / Mouse (ortholog); Top expressed in: right frontal lobe; anterior cingulate cortex; prefrontal cortex; left testis; apex of heart; anterior pituitary; right testis; muscle of thigh; amygdala; right hemisphere of cerebellum / Top expressed in: superior frontal gyrus; muscle of thigh; spermatocyte; lip; spermatid; ventricular zone; primary visual cortex; dentate gyrus of hippocampal formation granule cell; right kidney; yolk sac; More reference expression data
BioGPS	More reference expression data
Gene ontology
Molecular function	nucleotide binding; protein binding; ATP binding; ubiquitin protein ligase binding; ubiquitin protein ligase activity; ubiquitin-protein transferase activity; NEDD8 transferase activity; transferase activity
Cellular component	cytoplasm; cytosol; nucleoplasm
Biological process	protein neddylation; positive regulation of neuron apoptotic process; protein ubiquitination; post-translational protein modification
Sources:Amigo / QuickGO
Orthologs
Databases	NCBI: entry; OMA: entry
Species	Human	Mouse
Entrez	9040	22192
Ensembl	ENSG00000130725	ENSMUSG00000005575
UniProt	P61081	P61082
RefSeq (mRNA)	NM_003969	NM_001168469; NM_001243968; NM_145578
RefSeq (protein)	NP_003960; NP_003960.1	NP_001161941; NP_001230897; NP_663553
Location (UCSC)	Chr 19: 58.56 – 58.56 Mb	Chr 7: 12.77 – 12.77 Mb
PubMed search
- Wikidata
View/Edit Human	View/Edit Mouse

NEDD8-conjugating enzyme Ubc12 is a protein that in humans is encoded by the UBE2M gene.

The modification of proteins with ubiquitin is an important cellular mechanism for targeting abnormal or short-lived proteins for degradation. Ubiquitination involves at least three classes of enzymes: ubiquitin-activating enzymes, or E1s, ubiquitin-conjugating enzymes, or E2s, and ubiquitin-protein ligases, or E3s. This gene encodes a member of the E2 ubiquitin-conjugating enzyme family. The encoded protein is linked with a ubiquitin-like protein, NEDD8, which can be conjugated to cellular proteins, such as Cdc53/culin.

== Interactions ==
UBE2M has been shown to interact with NEDD8, PRKAR1A and UBA3.
