= Ubiquitin D =

Protein-coding gene in the species Homo sapiens

UBD

Identifiers
- Aliases: UBD, FAT10, GABBR1, UBD-3, ubiquitin D
- External IDs: OMIM: 606050; MGI: 1344410; GeneCards: UBD
Available structures
PDB	Ortholog search: PDBe RCSB
PDB	List of PDB id codes 2MBE

Gene location (Human)
Chr.	Chromosome 6 (human)
Band	6p22.1	Start	29,555,515 bp
Band	6p22.1	End	29,559,732 bp

Gene location (Mouse)
Chr.	Chromosome 17 (mouse)
Band	17|17 B1	Start	37,504,783 bp
Band	17|17 B1	End	37,506,986 bp
RNA expression pattern
Bgee	Human / Mouse (ortholog); Top expressed in: appendix; lymph node; islet of Langerhans; rectum; gallbladder; human kidney; tonsil; olfactory zone of nasal mucosa; liver; spleen / Top expressed in: thymus; mesenteric lymph nodes; jejunum; mucous cell of stomach; lactiferous gland; subcutaneous adipose tissue; embryo; duodenum; spleen; intestinal villus; More reference expression data
BioGPS	n/a
Gene ontology
Molecular function	proteasome binding; protein binding
Cellular component	cytoplasm; aggresome; nucleus; fibrillar center; cytosol
Biological process	positive regulation of I-kappaB kinase/NF-kappaB signaling; response to tumor necrosis factor; myeloid dendritic cell differentiation; protein modification by small protein conjugation; protein ubiquitination; ubiquitin-dependent protein catabolic process; response to interferon-gamma; proteolysis; aggresome assembly; positive regulation of apoptotic process; post-translational protein modification; regulation of mitotic cell cycle phase transition
Sources:Amigo / QuickGO
Orthologs
Databases	NCBI: entry; OMA: entry
Species	Human	Mouse
Entrez	10537	24108
Ensembl	ENSG00000228913; ENSG00000231968; ENSG00000206468; ENSG00000206513; ENSG00000224654 ENSG00000213886; ENSG00000226898	ENSMUSG00000035186
UniProt	O15205	P63072
RefSeq (mRNA)	NM_006398	NM_023137
RefSeq (protein)	NP_006389	NP_075626
Location (UCSC)	Chr 6: 29.56 – 29.56 Mb	Chr 17: 37.5 – 37.51 Mb
PubMed search
- Wikidata
View/Edit Human	View/Edit Mouse

Ubiquitin D is a protein that in humans is encoded by the UBD gene, also known as FAT10. UBD is a member of the ubiquitin-like protein family and participates in protein turnover by targeting substrates for degradation by the proteasome.

== Structure ==
The UBD gene is located within the human major histocompatibility complex (MHC) class I locus on chromosome 6 and was initially identified in reticuloendothelial tissues and mucosal-associated lymphoid systems. The encoded protein has a molecular weight of approximately 18 kDa and contains N- and C-terminal regions that share 29% and 36% sequence identity with ubiquitin, respectively. Unlike other ubiquitin-like modifiers, UBD contains a free C-terminal diglycine motif that allows direct conjugation to target proteins.

== Function ==
UBD functions in a manner analogous to ubiquitin by covalently modifying proteins and directing them to proteasomal degradation. Among ubiquitin-like proteins, UBD is unique in that it can also directly guide noncovalently bound proteins to the proteasome. In addition to its role in protein degradation, UBD has been implicated in the regulation of mitosis, chromosome stability, apoptosis, and immune responses.

== Clinical significance ==
Dysregulation of UBD expression has been associated with altered apoptosis, abnormal cell division, and chromosomal instability, processes that are linked to neoplastic transformation. Increased UBD expression has been reported in several tumor types, including liver, cervical, ovarian, pancreatic, gastric, and small intestine adenocarcinomas, while little or no upregulation has been observed in thyroid, prostate, or kidney cancers. In hepatocellular carcinoma, elevated UBD expression has been associated with increased levels of proliferating cell nuclear antigen, a marker of cell proliferation, and with enhanced tumor growth in experimental models. Overexpression of UBD has also been linked to the formation of Mallory–Denk bodies in chronic liver disease. In gastric cancer, increased UBD expression has been correlated with metastasis, tumor stage, and prognosis, and both UBD mRNA and protein levels have been reported as independent prognostic indicators. UBD expression can be induced by interferon-γ and tumor necrosis factor-α through an interferon sequence–responsive element in its promoter, suggesting a link between inflammatory signaling and UBD regulation.

== Interactions ==
UBD has been shown to interact with NUB1 and MAD2L1.
