= UBX protein domain =

Protein domain

UBX
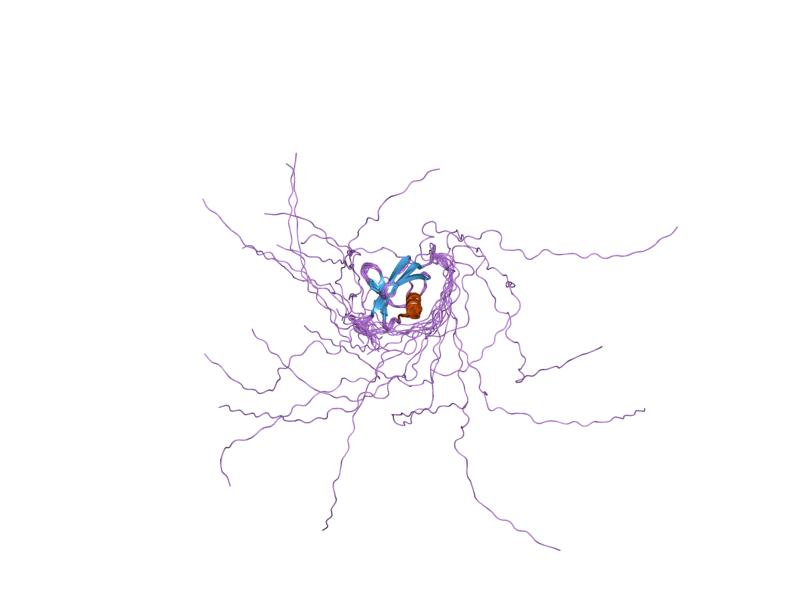
- solution structure of the ubx domain of kiaa0794 protein

Identifiers
- Symbol: UBX
- Pfam: PF00789
- Pfam clan: CL0072
- InterPro: IPR001012
- SMART: UBX
- SCOP2: 1i42 / SCOPe / SUPFAM
Available protein structures:
- PDB: IPR001012 PF00789 (ECOD; PDBsum)
- AlphaFold: IPR001012; PF00789

In molecular biology, the UBX protein domain is a protein domain that is found in ubiquitin-regulatory proteins, which are members of the ubiquitination pathway, as well as a number of other ubiquitin-like proteins including FAF-1 (FAS-associated factor 1), the human Rep-8 reproduction protein and several hypothetical proteins from yeast. The function of the UBX domain is not known although the fragment of avian FAF-1 containing the UBX domain causes apoptosis of transfected cells.

== Function ==
So far, as yet, no general function for the UBX domain has yet emerged. Additionally, the absence of a carboxy-terminal di-glycine motif, however, indicates that UBX domains are not covalently attached to target proteins in a ubiquitin-like manner.

== Structure ==
The UBX domain comprises about 80 amino acid residues. They are distinct structural units defining a large family of proteins that often exhibit a modular domain architecture three-dimensional structures of UBX domains reveal a close structural relationship with ubiquitin despite the lack of significant sequence homology

== Homology ==
UBX domain is very similar to ubiquitin which gives us some indication of evolution. There are ubiquitin fusion which seem to be advantageous for ribosomal subunit folding.
