= SENP8 =

Protein-coding gene in the species Homo sapiens

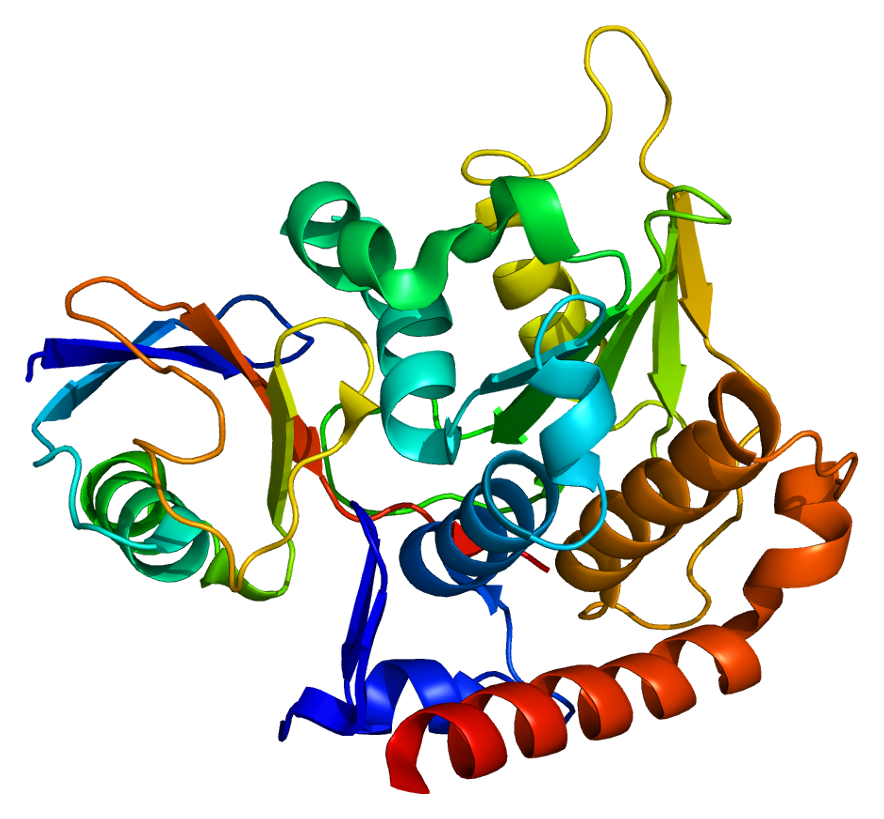

Identifiers
- Aliases: SENP8, DEN1, NEDP1, PRSC2, SUMO/sentrin peptidase family member, NEDD8 specific, SUMO peptidase family member, NEDD8 specific
- External IDs: OMIM: 608659; MGI: 1918849; GeneCards: SENP8
Available structures
PDB	Ortholog search: PDBe RCSB
PDB	List of PDB id codes 1XT9, 2BKQ, 2BKR

Gene location (Human)
Chr.	Chromosome 15 (human)
Band	15q23	Start	72,114,258 bp
Band	15q23	End	72,143,692 bp

Gene location (Mouse)
Chr.	Chromosome 9 (mouse)
Band	9|9 B	Start	59,641,542 bp
Band	9|9 B	End	59,657,993 bp
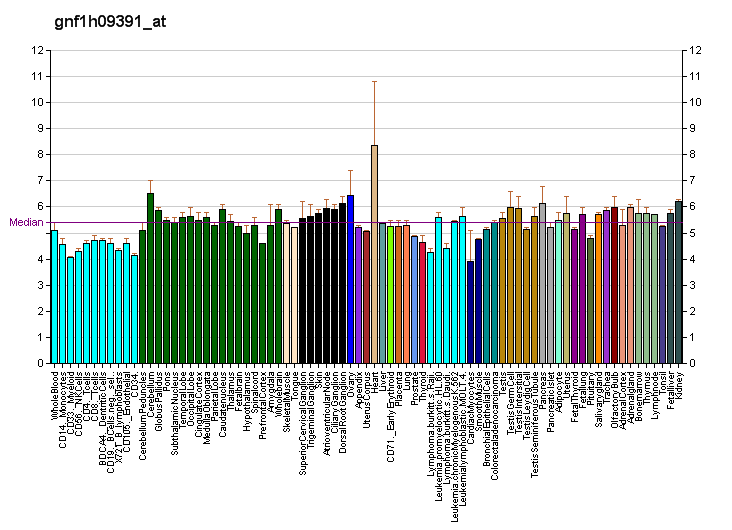
RNA expression pattern
Bgee	Human / Mouse (ortholog); Top expressed in: sperm; gonad; secondary oocyte; testicle; right testis; left testis; muscle of thigh; islet of Langerhans; gastrocnemius muscle; ventricular zone / Top expressed in: secondary oocyte; zygote; primary oocyte; lumbar spinal ganglion; genital tubercle; tail of embryo; hand; otolith organ; facial motor nucleus; utricle; More reference expression data
BioGPS	More reference expression data
Gene ontology
Molecular function	peptidase activity; cysteine-type peptidase activity; hydrolase activity; NEDD8-specific protease activity; endopeptidase activity
Cellular component	cytosol; nucleus
Biological process	proteolysis; protein deubiquitination; protein desumoylation; post-translational protein modification
Sources:Amigo / QuickGO
Orthologs
Databases	NCBI: entry; OMA: entry
Species	Human	Mouse
Entrez	123228	71599
Ensembl	ENSG00000166192	ENSMUSG00000051705
UniProt	Q96LD8	Q9D2Z4
RefSeq (mRNA)	NM_001166340; NM_001172109; NM_001172110; NM_001172111; NM_145204	NM_001172068; NM_001172069; NM_001172070; NM_001172071; NM_027838
RefSeq (protein)	NP_001159812; NP_001165580; NP_001165581; NP_001165582; NP_660205	NP_001165539; NP_001165540; NP_001165541; NP_001165542; NP_082114
Location (UCSC)	Chr 15: 72.11 – 72.14 Mb	Chr 9: 59.64 – 59.66 Mb
PubMed search
- Wikidata
View/Edit Human	View/Edit Mouse

Sentrin-specific protease 8 is an enzyme that in humans is encoded by the SENP8 gene.

NEDD8 (MIM 603171) is a ubiquitin-like protein that becomes conjugated to the cullin (see CUL1; MIM 603134) subunit of several ubiquitin ligases. This conjugation, called neddylation, is required for optimal ubiquitin ligase activity. NEDD8-specific deneddylases, such as NEDP1, or DEN1, are required to process the NEDD8 propeptide at a C-terminal diglycine motif and to remove NEDD8 from cullins (Gan-Erdene et al., 2003).[supplied by OMIM]
