= Pevonedistat =

Chemical compound

Identifiers
- IUPAC name: [(1S,2S,4R)-4-[4-[ [(1S)-2,3-dihydro-1H-inden-1-yl]amino]pyrrolo[2,3-d]pyrimidin-7-yl]-2-hydroxycyclopentyl]methyl sulfamate
- CAS Number: 905579-51-3
- PubChem CID: 16720766
- DrugBank: DB11759
- UNII: S3AZD8D215
- KEGG: D10413
- ChEMBL: ChEMBL1231160
- CompTox Dashboard (EPA): DTXSID701022549

Chemical and physical data
- Formula: C_{21}H_{25}N_{5}O_{4}S
- Molar mass: 443.52 g·mol^{−1}
- 3D model (JSmol): Interactive image
- SMILES: C1CC2=CC=CC=C2[C@H]1NC3=C4C=CN(C4=NC=N3)[C@@H]5C[C@H]([C@H](C5)O)COS(=O)(=O)N
- InChI: InChI=1S/C21H25N5O4S/c22-31(28,29)30-11-14-9-15(10-19(14)27)26-8-7-17-20(23-12-24-21(17)26)25-18-6-5-13-3-1-2-4-16(13)18/h1-4,7-8,12,14-15,18-19,27H,5-6,9-11H2,(H2,22,28,29)(H,23,24,25)/t14-,15+,18-,19-/m0/s1; Key:MPUQHZXIXSTTDU-QXGSTGNESA-N

Pevonedistat (MLN4924) is a selective NEDD8 inhibitor. It is being investigated as a cancer treatment, e.g. for mantle cell lymphoma (MCL).

== Target of pevonedistat ==
NEDD8-activating enzyme (NAE) is a heterodimeric molecule consisting of amyloid beta precursor protein-binding protein 1 (APPBP1) and ubiquitin-like modifier activating enzyme 3 (UBA3). As reviewed by Xu et al., in a first step NAE binds ATP and NEDD8 and catalyzes the formation of a NEDD8-AMP intermediate. This intermediate binds the adenylation domain of NAE. NEDD8-AMP reacts with the catalytic cysteine in UBA3 during which NEDD8 is transferred to the catalytic cysteine, resulting in a high energy thioester linkage. NAE then binds ATP and NEDD8 to generate a second NEDD8-AMP, forming a fully loaded NAE carrying two activated NEDD8 molecules (i.e., one as a thioester and the other as an adenylate).

Pevonedistat is an AMP mimetic. Pevonedistat forms a stable covalent adduct with NEDD8 in the NAE catalytic pocket of UBA3 by reacting with thioester-linked NEDD8 bound to the enzyme's catalytic cysteine. Unlike the labile NEDD8-AMP intermediate, the NEDD8-pevonedistat adduct cannot be utilized in subsequent reactions necessary for NAE activity.

== Mechanism of action ==
"Inhibition of NAE prevents activation of cullin-RING ligases (CRLs), which are critical for proteasome-mediated protein degradation." MLN4924 has been shown to disrupt CRL-mediated protein turnover leading to apoptosis in cancer cells by deregulating S-phase DNA synthesis. Essentially, it encourages apoptosis in dividing cells.

In addition to proteasome-mediated protein degradation, activated NEDD8 is needed for at least two pathways of DNA repair: nucleotide excision repair (NER) and non-homologous end joining (NHEJ) (see NEDD8).

One or more DNA repair genes in seven DNA repair pathways are frequently epigenetically silenced in cancers (see e.g. DNA repair pathways).) This is a likely source of genome instability in cancers. If activation of NEDD8 is inhibited by pevonedistat, cells will then have an additional induced deficiency of NER or NHEJ. Such cells may then die because of deficient DNA repair leading to accumulation of DNA damages. The effect of NEDD8 inhibition may be greater for cancer cells than for normal cells if the cancer cells are already deficient in DNA repair due to prior epigenetic silencing of DNA repair genes active in alternative pathways (see synthetic lethality).

== Clinical trials ==
In a phase 1 trial to determine dosing in patients with AML and myelodysplastic syndromes "modest clinical activity was observed".

Later, in 2016, pevonedistat demonstrated a significant therapeutic effect in three further Phase I clinical cancer trials. These include pevonedistat trials against relapsed/refractory multiple myeloma or lymphoma, metastatic melanoma, and advanced solid tumors.

These were followed by several phase I and II clinical trials in a variety of advanced cancer types. Currently, pevonedistat is being investigated in combination therapies rather than as a single agent. In 2020, Pevonedistat was denominated by the FDA as a Breakthrough Therapy Designation.
