= AIPL1 =

Protein-coding gene in the species Homo sapiens

Identifiers
- Aliases: AIPL1, AIPL2, LCA4, aryl hydrocarbon receptor interacting protein like 1
- External IDs: OMIM: 604392; MGI: 2148800; GeneCards: AIPL1

Gene location (Human)
Chr.	Chromosome 17 (human)
Band	17p13.2	Start	6,393,693 bp
Band	17p13.2	End	6,435,199 bp

Gene location (Mouse)
Chr.	Chromosome 11 (mouse)
Band	11|11 B4	Start	71,918,789 bp
Band	11|11 B4	End	71,928,335 bp
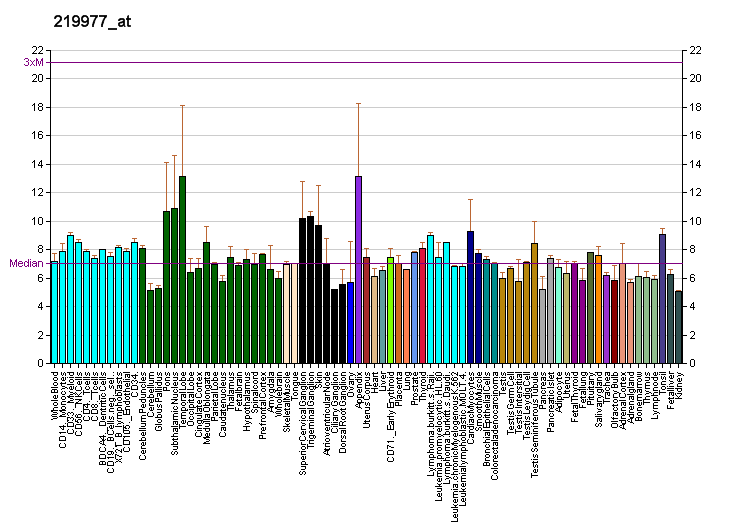
RNA expression pattern
Bgee	Human / Mouse (ortholog); Top expressed in: pancreatic ductal cell; retina; retinal pigment epithelium; pineal gland; deltoid muscle; Epithelium of choroid plexus; skin of abdomen; skin of thigh; ventricular zone; pituitary gland / Top expressed in: neural layer of retina; retinal pigment epithelium; pineal gland; epithelium of lens; embryo; ciliary body; iris; endothelial cell of lymphatic vessel; conjunctival fornix; cornea; More reference expression data
BioGPS	More reference expression data
Gene ontology
Molecular function	unfolded protein binding; protein binding; farnesylated protein binding; peptidyl-prolyl cis-trans isomerase activity
Cellular component	photoreceptor inner segment; cytoplasm; nucleus; nucleoplasm; cytosol
Biological process	retina homeostasis; negative regulation of apoptotic process; protein farnesylation; response to stimulus; visual perception; phototransduction of visible light; regulation of rhodopsin mediated signaling pathway; protein peptidyl-prolyl isomerization
Sources:Amigo / QuickGO
Orthologs
Databases	NCBI: entry; OMA: entry
Species	Human	Mouse
Entrez	23746	114230
Ensembl	ENSG00000129221	ENSMUSG00000040554
UniProt	Q9NZN9	Q924K1
RefSeq (mRNA)	NM_014336; NM_001033054; NM_001033055; NM_001285399; NM_001285400 NM_001285401; NM_001285402; NM_001285403	NM_053245
RefSeq (protein)	NP_001028226; NP_001028227; NP_001272328; NP_001272329; NP_001272330 NP_001272331; NP_001272332; NP_055151	NP_444475
Location (UCSC)	Chr 17: 6.39 – 6.44 Mb	Chr 11: 71.92 – 71.93 Mb
PubMed search
- Wikidata
View/Edit Human	View/Edit Mouse

Aryl-hydrocarbon-interacting protein-like 1 is a protein that in humans is encoded by the AIPL1 gene. The protein is a member of FKBP prolyl isomerase family.

== Function ==
Leber congenital amaurosis (LCA) accounts for at least 5% of all inherited retinal disease and is the most severe inherited retinopathy with the earliest age of onset. Individuals affected with LCA are diagnosed at birth or in the first few months of life with severely impaired vision or blindness, nystagmus and an abnormal or flat electroretinogram. The photoreceptor/pineal -expressed gene, AIPL1, encoding aryl-hydrocarbon interacting protein-like 1, was mapped within the LCA4 candidate region. The protein contains three tetratricopeptide motifs, consistent with nuclear transport or chaperone activity. AIPL1 mutations may cause approximately 20% of recessive LCA.

== Interactions ==
AIPL1 has been shown to interact with NUB1.

== See also ==
- Aryl hydrocarbon
- Aryl hydrocarbon receptor
- AH receptor-interacting protein, AIP
