= UBE2F =

Enzyme found in humans

Identifiers
- Aliases: UBE2F, NCE2, ubiquitin conjugating enzyme E2 F (putative)
- External IDs: OMIM: 617700; MGI: 1915171; GeneCards: UBE2F
Available structures
PDB	Ortholog search: PDBe RCSB
PDB	List of PDB id codes 2EDI, 3FN1, 4GBA
Enzyme activity
EC #	BRENDA	ExPASy	KEGG	MetaCyc
2.3.2.34	↗	↗	↗	↗

Gene location (Human)
Chr.	Chromosome 2 (human)
Band	2q37.3	Start	237,966,827 bp
Band	2q37.3	End	238,042,782 bp

Gene location (Mouse)
Chr.	Chromosome 1 (mouse)
Band	1|1 D	Start	91,178,026 bp
Band	1|1 D	End	91,218,059 bp
RNA expression pattern
Bgee	Human / Mouse (ortholog); Top expressed in: body of pancreas; right auricle of heart; white blood cell; pancreatic epithelial cell; monocyte; granulocyte; islet of Langerhans; amniotic fluid; pons; gastrocnemius muscle / Top expressed in: blood; condyle; fossa; endocardial cushion; facial motor nucleus; fetal liver hematopoietic progenitor cell; spermatid; motor neuron; atrioventricular junction; seminiferous tubule; More reference expression data
BioGPS	n/a
Gene ontology
Molecular function	ATP binding; ubiquitin protein ligase activity; nucleotide binding; ubiquitin protein ligase binding; protein binding; transferase activity; NEDD8 transferase activity; NEDD8 conjugating enzyme activity
Cellular component	cytoplasm; cytosol
Biological process	protein neddylation; protein ubiquitination; post-translational protein modification
Sources:Amigo / QuickGO
Orthologs
Databases	NCBI: entry; OMA: entry
Species	Human	Mouse
Entrez	140739	67921
Ensembl	ENSG00000184182	ENSMUSG00000034343
UniProt	Q969M7	Q9CY34
RefSeq (mRNA)	NM_001278305; NM_001278306; NM_001278307; NM_001278308; NM_080678	NM_026454; NM_001355761; NM_001355762; NM_001355763; NM_001355764
RefSeq (protein)	NP_001265234; NP_001265235; NP_001265236; NP_001265237; NP_542409	NP_080730; NP_001342690; NP_001342691; NP_001342692; NP_001342693
Location (UCSC)	Chr 2: 237.97 – 238.04 Mb	Chr 1: 91.18 – 91.22 Mb
PubMed search
- Wikidata
View/Edit Human	View/Edit Mouse

NEDD8-conjugating enzyme UBE2F is an enzyme that in humans is encoded by the UBE2F gene. This enzyme interacts with ubiquitin-like protein NEDD8 from the UBA3-NAE1 protein complex, and attaches it to other proteins covalently. In particular, it participates in the neddylation of cullin-5.
