= Ubiquitin carboxy-terminal hydrolase L1 =

Protein-coding gene in the species Homo sapiens

UCHL1
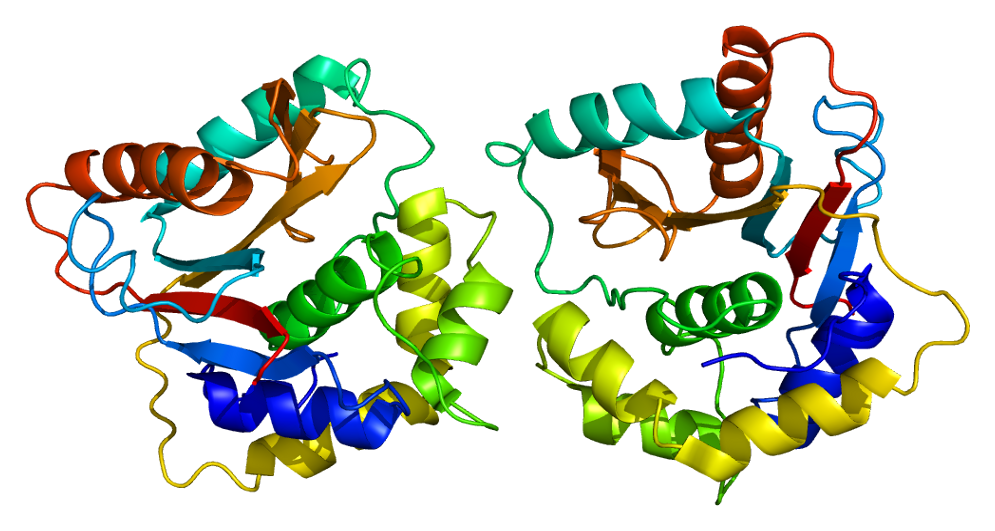

Identifiers
- Aliases: UCHL1, HEL-117, NDGOA, PARK5, PGP 9.5, PGP9.5, PGP95, Uch-L1, HEL-S-53, ubiquitin C-terminal hydrolase L1, SPG79, UCHL-1
- External IDs: OMIM: 191342; MGI: 103149; GeneCards: UCHL1
Available structures
PDB	Ortholog search: PDBe RCSB
PDB	List of PDB id codes 4JKJ, 2ETL, 2LEN, 3IFW, 3IRT, 3KVF, 3KW5, 4DM9
Enzyme activity
EC #	BRENDA	ExPASy	KEGG	MetaCyc
3.4.19.12	↗	↗	↗	↗

Gene location (Human)
Chr.	Chromosome 4 (human)
Band	4p13	Start	41,256,413 bp
Band	4p13	End	41,268,455 bp

Gene location (Mouse)
Chr.	Chromosome 5 (mouse)
Band	5 C3.1|5 35.95 cM	Start	66,833,434 bp
Band	5 C3.1|5 35.95 cM	End	66,844,577 bp
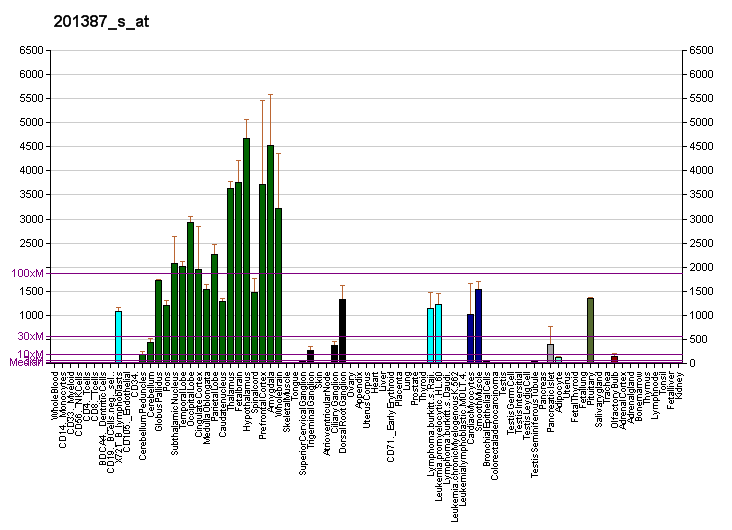
RNA expression pattern
Bgee	Human / Mouse (ortholog); Top expressed in: pons; right frontal lobe; lateral nuclear group of thalamus; spinal ganglia; prefrontal cortex; pars compacta; superior vestibular nucleus; dorsolateral prefrontal cortex; hypothalamus; nucleus accumbens / Top expressed in: superior cervical ganglion; medial dorsal nucleus; superior frontal gyrus; transitional epithelium of urinary bladder; medial vestibular nucleus; ventromedial nucleus; dentate gyrus of hippocampal formation granule cell; primary visual cortex; dorsomedial hypothalamic nucleus; mammillary body; More reference expression data
BioGPS	More reference expression data
Gene ontology
Molecular function	cysteine-type peptidase activity; peptidase activity; ligase activity; ubiquitin binding; protein binding; alpha-2A adrenergic receptor binding; omega peptidase activity; cysteine-type endopeptidase activity; hydrolase activity; ubiquitin protein ligase binding; thiol-dependent deubiquitinase
Cellular component	cytoplasm; membrane; endoplasmic reticulum membrane; myelin sheath; plasma membrane; intracellular anatomical structure; nucleoplasm; axon; soma; endoplasmic reticulum; neuron projection terminus; axon cytoplasm; cytosol
Biological process	axon target recognition; eating behavior; axonogenesis; ubiquitin-dependent protein catabolic process; proteolysis; axonal transport of mitochondrion; response to ischemia; neuromuscular process; negative regulation of MAP kinase activity; sensory perception of pain; cell population proliferation; regulation of macroautophagy; adult walking behavior; proteasome-mediated ubiquitin-dependent protein catabolic process; protein deubiquitination
Sources:Amigo / QuickGO
Orthologs
Databases	NCBI: entry; OMA: entry
Species	Human	Mouse
Entrez	7345	22223
Ensembl	ENSG00000154277	ENSMUSG00000029223
UniProt	P09936	Q9R0P9
RefSeq (mRNA)	NM_004181	NM_011670
RefSeq (protein)	NP_004172	NP_035800
Location (UCSC)	Chr 4: 41.26 – 41.27 Mb	Chr 5: 66.83 – 66.84 Mb
PubMed search
- Wikidata
View/Edit Human	View/Edit Mouse

Ubiquitin Carboxy-terminal Hydrolase L1 (UCH-L1)
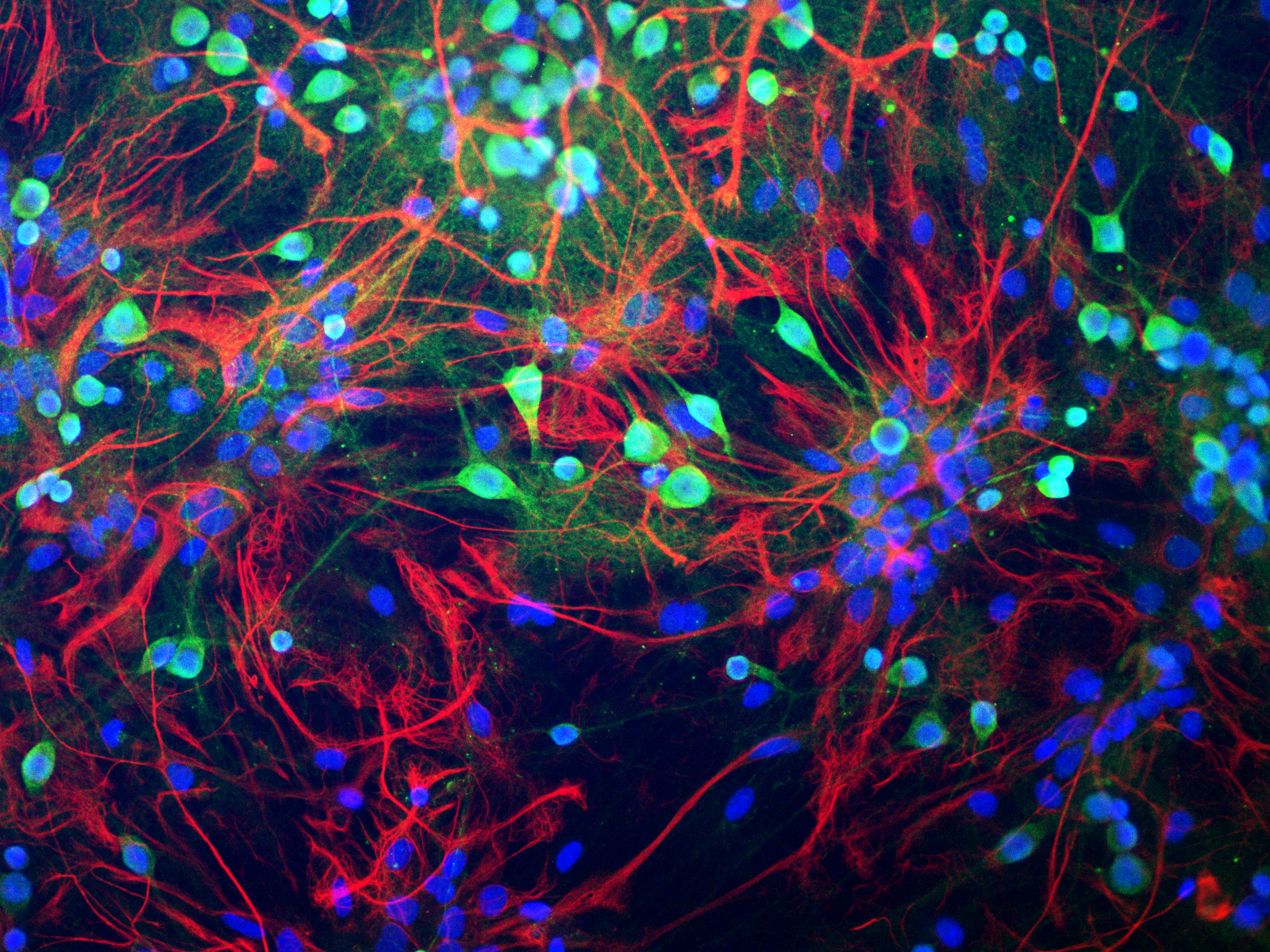
- Neurons from rat brain tissue stained green with antibody to ubiquitin C-terminal hydrolase L1 (UCH-L1) which highlights the cell body strongly and the cell processes more weakly. Astrocytes are stained in red with antibody to the GFAP protein found in cytoplasmic filaments. Nuclei of all cell types are stained blue with a DNA binding dye. Antibodies, cell preparation and image generated by EnCor Biotechnology Inc.

Ubiquitin carboxy-terminal hydrolase L1 (EC 3.1.2.15, ubiquitin C-terminal hydrolase, UCH-L1) is a deubiquitinating enzyme.

== Function ==
UCH-L1 is a member of a gene family whose products hydrolyze small C-terminal adducts of ubiquitin to generate the ubiquitin monomer. Expression of UCH-L1 is highly specific to neurons and to cells of the diffuse neuroendocrine system and their tumors. It is abundantly present in all neurons (accounts for 1-2% of total brain protein), expressed specifically in neurons and testis/ovary.

The catalytic triad of UCH-L1 contains a cysteine at position 90, an aspartate at position 176, and a histidine at position 161 that are responsible for its hydrolase activity.

== Relevance to neurodegenerative disorders ==
A point mutation (I93M) in the gene encoding this protein is implicated as the cause of Parkinson's disease in one German family, although this finding is controversial, as no other Parkinson's disease patients with this mutation have been found.

Furthermore, a polymorphism (S18Y) in this gene has been found to be associated with a reduced risk for Parkinson's disease. This polymorphism has specifically been shown to have antioxidant activity.

Another potentially protective function of UCH-L1 is its reported ability to stabilize monoubiquitin, an important component of the ubiquitin proteasome system. It is thought that by stabilizing the monomers of ubiquitin and thereby preventing their degradation, UCH-L1 increases the available pool of ubiquitin to be tagged onto proteins destined to be degraded by the proteasome.

The gene is also associated with Alzheimer's disease, and required for normal synaptic and cognitive function. Loss of Uchl1 increases the susceptibility of pancreatic beta-cells to programmed cell death, indicating that this protein plays a protective role in neuroendocrine cells and illustrating a link between diabetes and neurodegenerative diseases.

Patients with early-onset neurodegeneration in which the causative mutation was in the UCHL1 gene (specifically, the ubiquitin binding domain, E7A) display blindness, cerebellar ataxia, nystagmus, dorsal column dysfunction, and upper motor neuron dysfunction.

== Ectopic expression ==
Although UCH-L1 protein expression is specific to neurons and testis/ovary tissue, it has been found to be expressed in certain lung-tumor cell lines. This abnormal expression of UCH-L1 is implicated in cancer and has led to the designation of UCH-L1 as an oncogene. Furthermore, there is evidence that UCH-L1 might play a role in the pathogenesis of membranous glomerulonephritis as UCH-L1 de novo expression in podocytes was seen in PHN, the rat model of human mGN. This UCH-L1 expression is thought to induce at least in part podocyte hypertrophy.

== Protein structure ==
Human UCH-L1 and the closely related protein UCHL3 have one of the most complicated knot structure yet discovered for a protein, with five knot crossings. It is speculated that a knot structure may increase a protein's resistance to degradation in the proteasome.

The conformation of the UCH-L1 protein may also be an important indication of neuroprotection or pathology. For example, the UCH-L1 dimer has been shown to exhibit the potentially pathogenic ligase activity and may lead to the aforementioned increase in aggregation of α-synuclein. The S18Y polymorphism of UCH-L1 has been shown to be less-prone to dimerization.

== Interactions ==
Ubiquitin carboxy-terminal hydrolase L1 has been shown to interact with COP9 constitutive photomorphogenic homolog subunit 5.

UCH-L1 has also been shown to interact with α-synuclein, another protein implicated in the pathology of Parkinson disease. This activity is reported to be the result of its ubiquityl ligase activity which may be associated with the I93M pathogenic mutation in the gene.

Most recently, UCH-L1 has been demonstrated to interact with the E3 ligase, parkin. Parkin has been demonstrated to bind and ubiquitinylate UCH-L1 to promote lysosomal degradation of UCH-L1.

== See also ==
- Ubiquitin carboxyl-terminal esterase L3—the gene UCHL3
- Alpha synuclein
- Parkinson disease
- Proteasome
