= UBA3 =

Protein-coding gene in the species Homo sapiens

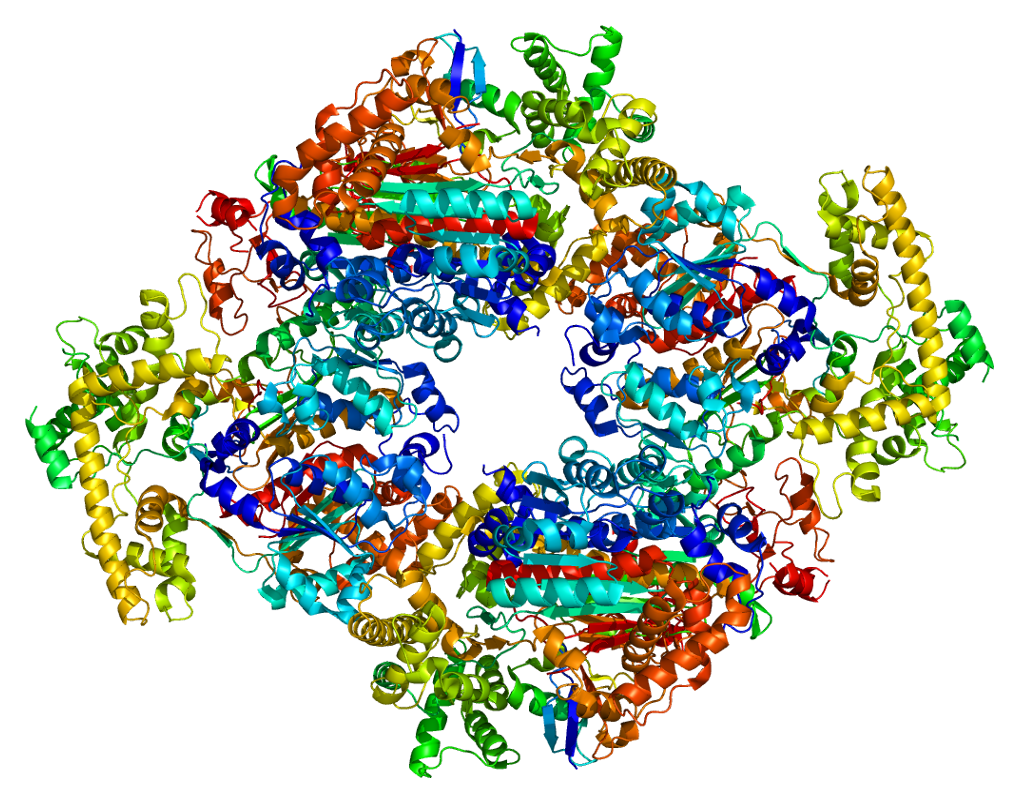

Identifiers
- Aliases: UBA3, NAE2, UBE1C, hubiquitin like modifier activating enzyme 3
- External IDs: OMIM: 603172; MGI: 1341217; GeneCards: UBA3
Available structures
PDB	Ortholog search: PDBe RCSB
PDB	List of PDB id codes 1R4M, 1R4N, 1TT5, 1Y8X, 1YOV, 2LQ7, 2NVU, 3DBH, 3DBL, 3DBR, 3FN1, 3GZN
Enzyme activity
EC #	BRENDA	ExPASy	KEGG	MetaCyc
6.2.1.64	↗	↗	↗	↗

Gene location (Human)
Chr.	Chromosome 3 (human)
Band	3p14.1	Start	69,054,730 bp
Band	3p14.1	End	69,080,408 bp

Gene location (Mouse)
Chr.	Chromosome 6 (mouse)
Band	6|6 D3	Start	97,160,631 bp
Band	6|6 D3	End	97,182,608 bp
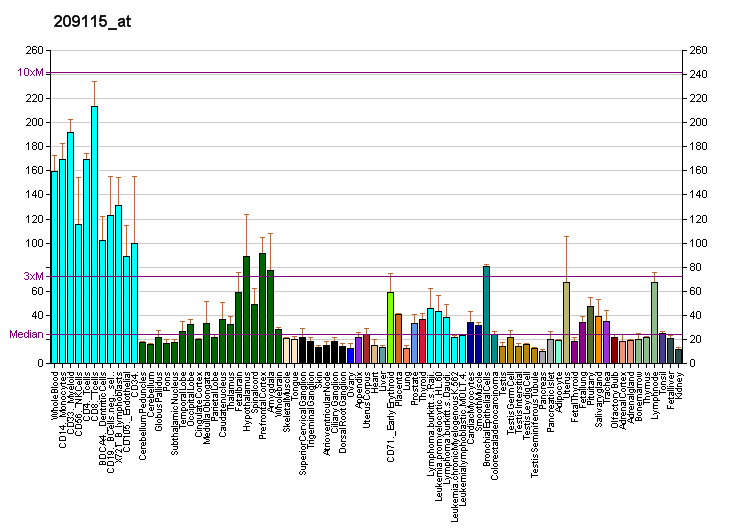
RNA expression pattern
Bgee	Human / Mouse (ortholog); Top expressed in: palpebral conjunctiva; monocyte; secondary oocyte; epithelium of nasopharynx; skin of thigh; germinal epithelium; gingival epithelium; right ventricle; skin of hip; mucosa of paranasal sinus / Top expressed in: otic placode; saccule; medullary collecting duct; barrel cortex; renal corpuscle; otic vesicle; primitive streak; atrioventricular junction; medial ganglionic eminence; superior cervical ganglion; More reference expression data
BioGPS	More reference expression data
Gene ontology
Molecular function	nucleotide binding; ligase activity; protein binding; protein heterodimerization activity; acid-amino acid ligase activity; NEDD8 activating enzyme activity; ubiquitin-like modifier activating enzyme activity; ATP binding; identical protein binding; NEDD8 transferase activity; nuclear receptor binding
Cellular component	nucleus; cytosol; cytoplasm; protein-containing complex
Biological process	proteolysis; regulation of cell cycle; mitotic cell cycle; endomitotic cell cycle; cell cycle; negative regulation of transcription, DNA-templated; post-translational protein modification; protein neddylation; protein modification by small protein conjugation
Sources:Amigo / QuickGO
Orthologs
Databases	NCBI: entry; OMA: entry
Species	Human	Mouse
Entrez	9039	22200
Ensembl	ENSG00000144744	ENSMUSG00000030061
UniProt	Q8TBC4	Q8C878
RefSeq (mRNA)	NM_003968; NM_198195; NM_198197; NM_001363861	NM_001111106; NM_001301857; NM_001301858; NM_001301859; NM_011666
RefSeq (protein)	NP_003959; NP_937838; NP_001350790	NP_001104576; NP_001288786; NP_001288787; NP_001288788; NP_035796
Location (UCSC)	Chr 3: 69.05 – 69.08 Mb	Chr 6: 97.16 – 97.18 Mb
PubMed search
- Wikidata
View/Edit Human	View/Edit Mouse

E2 binding domain
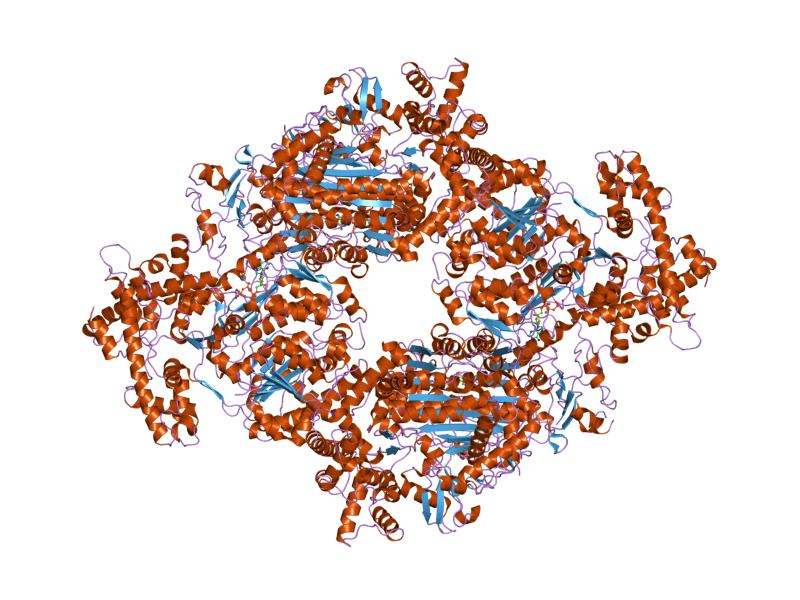
- appbp1-uba3-nedd8, an e1-ubiquitin-like protein complex with atp

Identifiers
- Symbol: E2_bind
- Pfam: PF08825
- InterPro: IPR014929
Available protein structures:
- PDB: IPR014929 PF08825 (ECOD; PDBsum)
- AlphaFold: IPR014929; PF08825

NEDD8-activating enzyme E1 catalytic subunit is a protein that in humans is encoded by the UBA3 gene.

The modification of proteins with ubiquitin is an important cellular mechanism for targeting abnormal or short-lived proteins for degradation. Ubiquitination involves at least three classes of enzymes: ubiquitin-activating enzymes, or E1s, ubiquitin-conjugating enzymes, or E2s, and ubiquitin-protein ligases, or E3s. This gene encodes a member of the E1 ubiquitin-activating enzyme family. The encoded enzyme associates with AppBp1, an amyloid beta precursor protein binding protein, to form a heterodimer, and then the enzyme complex activates NEDD8, a ubiquitin-like protein, which regulates cell division, signaling and embryogenesis. Multiple alternatively spliced transcript variants encoding distinct isoforms have been found for this gene.

This enzyme contains an E2 binding domain, which resembles ubiquitin, and recruits the catalytic core of the E2 enzyme UBE2M (Ubc12) in a similar manner to that in which ubiquitin interact interacts with ubiquitin binding domains.

== Interactions ==
UBE1C has been shown to interact with NEDD8, APPBP1 and UBE2M.
