= UCHL3 =

Human gene and enzyme

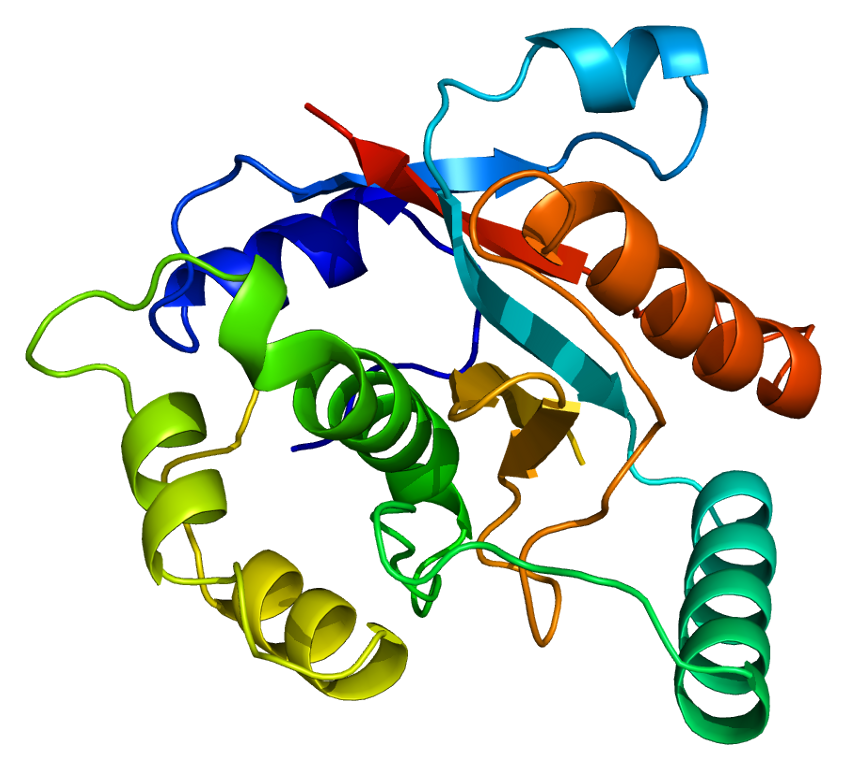
Available structures
PDB	Ortholog search: PDBe RCSB
PDB	List of PDB id codes 1UCH, 1XD3

Identifiers
- Aliases: UCHL3, UCH-L3, ubiquitin C-terminal hydrolase L3
- External IDs: OMIM: 603090; MGI: 1355274; HomoloGene: 4377; GeneCards: UCHL3; OMA:UCHL3 - orthologs

Gene location (Human)
Chr.	Chromosome 13 (human)
Band	13q22.2	Start	75,549,480 bp
Band	13q22.2	End	75,606,020 bp

Gene location (Mouse)
Chr.	Chromosome 14 (mouse)
Band	14 E2.3|14 50.9 cM	Start	101,891,403 bp
Band	14 E2.3|14 50.9 cM	End	101,933,561 bp
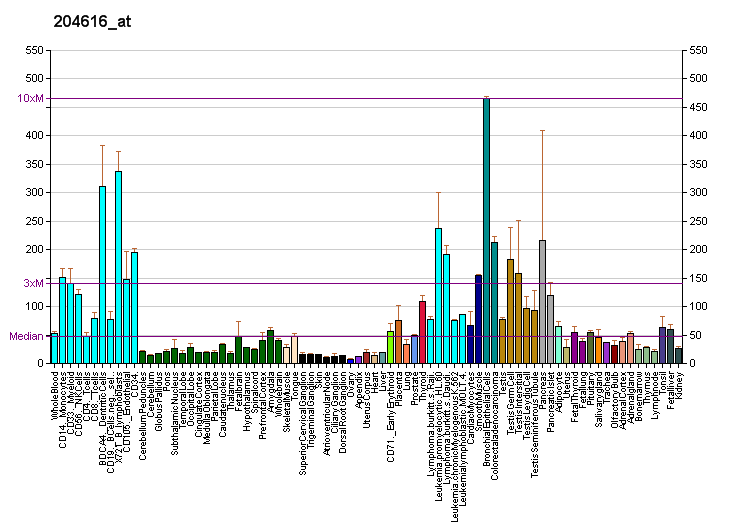
RNA expression pattern
Bgee	Human / Mouse (ortholog); Top expressed in: right adrenal gland; right adrenal cortex; left adrenal gland; islet of Langerhans; left adrenal cortex; mucosa of esophagus; rectum; skin of leg; gastrocnemius muscle; skin of abdomen / Top expressed in: left ventricle; interventricular septum; spermatid; epiblast; embryo; spermatocyte; neural tube; esophagus; placenta; mesencephalon; More reference expression data
BioGPS	More reference expression data
Gene ontology
Molecular function	protein binding; cysteine-type peptidase activity; hydrolase activity; peptidase activity; ubiquitin binding; NEDD8-specific protease activity; thiol-dependent deubiquitinase
Cellular component	nucleus; intracellular anatomical structure; cytoplasm; cytosol
Biological process	protein catabolic process; proteolysis; ubiquitin-dependent protein catabolic process; post-translational protein modification; protein deubiquitination; protein ubiquitination
Sources:Amigo / QuickGO
Orthologs
Species	Human	Mouse
Entrez	7347	50933
Ensembl	ENSG00000118939	ENSMUSG00000022111
UniProt	P15374	Q9JKB1
RefSeq (mRNA)	NM_001270952; NM_006002	NM_016723
RefSeq (protein)	NP_001257881; NP_005993	NP_057932
Location (UCSC)	Chr 13: 75.55 – 75.61 Mb	Chr 14: 101.89 – 101.93 Mb
PubMed search
- Wikidata
View/Edit Human	View/Edit Mouse

Ubiquitin carboxyl-terminal hydrolase isozyme L3 is an enzyme that in humans is encoded by the UCHL3 gene.

== Interactions ==
UCHL3 has been shown to interact with NEDD8 and the tauopathy and synucleinopathy associated mutated ubiquitin molecule UBB+1.

== See also ==
- Ubiquitin carboxy-terminal hydrolase L1—an enzyme
