= Yi Sun (consultant) =

Chinese management consultant (born 1975)

- Born: 1975 (age 50–51); Shanghai
- Occupation: management consultant

Yi Sun (born 1975) is a Chinese management consultant. She has arranged a significant number of German companies to be sold to Chinese investors. Insolvency administrators also contacted her directly. Initially, most jobs were retained as a result of investments in concept-supporting companies. She became known when the German magazine Stern described her as "the nightmare of the German Minister of Economics on high heels" and asked the provocative question if she is the woman who is selling Germany.

== Life ==
Yi Sun was born in Shanghai and grew up in Singapore. At the age of 12 her parents took her in a boarding school with language and culture lessons in German and French, as well as English and Japanese. In her family, German was spoken. She graduated at the age of 21.

Later, when she joined Ernst & Young (EY), after just three years with EY, she became an EY partner.

Sun is living in Düsseldorf with her family.

== Work ==
In 2001, the Chinese government ordered "spread out" and thus initiated the strategy Made in China 2025. The aim is to rise from a low-cost producer to key industries and expand China's influence in the world. Chinese investors have a strategic approach and are usually supported by their government.

The acquisitions were slowed down by the law to protect key German industry with critical infrastructure, which had very little effect on the development itself.

== The German view ==
- (German) Chinesische Übernahmen: „Target“ Deutschland, DW-TV 12. Juni 2016
- (German) China kauft deutsche Firmen: Droht Deutschland der Ausverkauf?, ProSieben – Galileo magazine, Episode 16, Season 2018, 18 Januar 2018 (China kauft deutsche Firmen: Droht Deutschland der Ausverkauf?)
- (German) Verbraucher – makro – Die Dealmakerin, ZDF vom 10. Oktober 2014
- (German) Gisela Baur, Ralph Gladitz, Claudia Erl: China kauft den Mittelstand – Schluss mit „Made in Germany?“, BR 31 January 2018 and WDR dieStory 11 April 2018
