= URM1 =

Identifiers
- Aliases: URM1, C9orf74, ubiquitin related modifier 1
- External IDs: OMIM: 612693; MGI: 1915455; GeneCards: URM1

Gene location (Human)
Chr.	Chromosome 9 (human)
Band	9q34.11	Start	128,371,361 bp
Band	9q34.11	End	128,392,016 bp

Gene location (Mouse)
Chr.	Chromosome 2 (mouse)
Band	2|2 B	Start	29,710,087 bp
Band	2|2 B	End	29,735,014 bp
RNA expression pattern
Bgee	Human / Mouse (ortholog); Top expressed in: apex of heart; parotid gland; mucosa of transverse colon; stromal cell of endometrium; body of pancreas; monocyte; C1 segment; right adrenal gland; body of stomach; right adrenal cortex / Top expressed in: yolk sac; morula; Rostral migratory stream; dentate gyrus of hippocampal formation granule cell; lip; optic nerve; epiblast; ventricular zone; muscle of thigh; medial vestibular nucleus; More reference expression data
BioGPS	n/a
Gene ontology
Molecular function	sulfurtransferase activity; protein binding; sulfur carrier activity
Cellular component	cytoplasm; cytosol
Biological process	tRNA thio-modification; tRNA processing; tRNA wobble uridine modification; protein urmylation; tRNA modification
Sources:Amigo / QuickGO
Orthologs
Databases	NCBI: entry; OMA: entry
Species	Human	Mouse
Entrez	81605	68205
Ensembl	ENSG00000167118	ENSMUSG00000069020
UniProt	Q9BTM9	Q9D2P4
RefSeq (mRNA)	NM_001135947; NM_001265582; NM_030914	NM_026615
RefSeq (protein)	NP_001129419; NP_001252511; NP_112176	NP_080891
Location (UCSC)	Chr 9: 128.37 – 128.39 Mb	Chr 2: 29.71 – 29.74 Mb
PubMed search
- Wikidata
View/Edit Human	View/Edit Mouse

Urm1 (Ubiquitin related modifier)
- Ubiquitin related modifier-1 (2qjl). In the center of protein β-grasp fold is located. Additionally, carboxy terminal glycine within a di-glycine motif is marked blue, and Mg ions are represented by black spheres.

Identifiers
- Symbol: URM1
- Pfam: PF09138
- InterPro: IPR015221
- SCOP2: d.15.3.3 / SCOPe / SUPFAM
Available protein structures:
- PDB: 1wgk 1xo3 2ax5 2k9x 2k9x 2qjl IPR015221 PF09138 (ECOD; PDBsum)
- AlphaFold: IPR015221; PF09138

Ubiquitin-related modifier-1 (URM1) is a protein that in humans is encoded by the gene URM1. This is a ubiquitin-like protein that, in yeast, modifies proteins in the ubiquitin-like urmylation pathway. Structural comparisons and phylogenetic analysis of the ubiquitin superfamily has indicated that Urm1 has the most conserved structural and sequence features of the common ancestor of the entire superfamily.

Urm1 is characterized by a core β-grasp fold and an essential carboxy terminal glycine within a di-glycine motif. Urm1 is known to be conjugated to the peroxiredoxin Ahp1, ATPBD3, and CTU2 and human MOCS3, through a mechanism involving the E1-like protein Uba4 via lysine residues. Similar to ubiquitination, urmylation requires a thioester intermediate and forms isopeptide bonds between Urm1 and its substrates. Moreover, the urmylation process can be significantly enhanced by oxidative stress. Functions as a protein tag with roles in nutrient sensing and oxidative stress response.

Recently it has been demonstrated that Urm1 can acts as a sulfur carrier in the thiolation of eukaryotic tRNA via a mechanism that requires the formation of a thiocarboxylated Urm1. URM1 is involved in thiolation of cytoplasmic tRNAs; receives sulfur from the E1-like enzyme Uba4 and transfers it to tRNA. Sequence and structural homology studies suggest that Urm1 can be more closely linked to the prokaryotic sulphur transfer proteins, ThiS and MoaD, that can be considered as prokaryotic counterparts of the eukaryotic UBls.

== See also ==
- Ubiquitin
