= NEDD8 =

Protein found in the human body

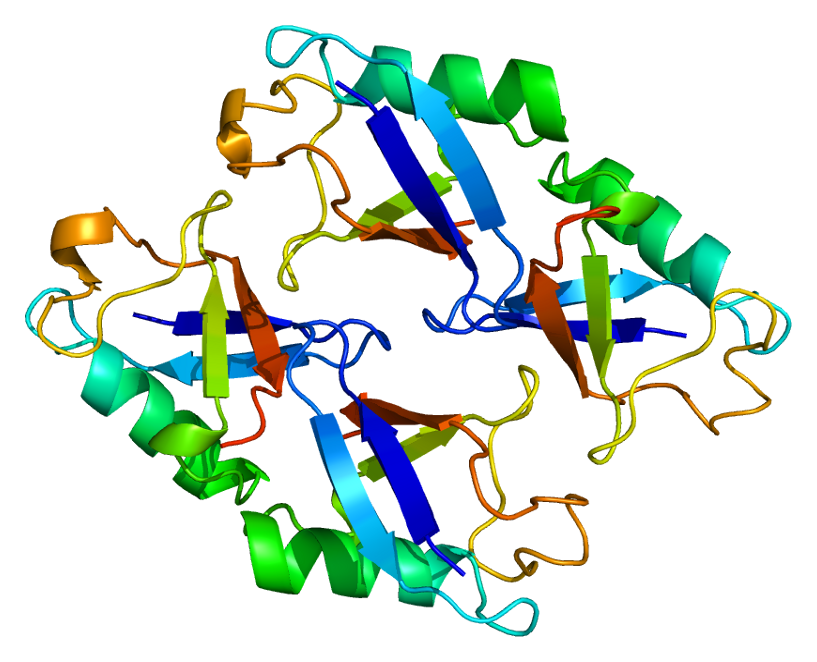

Identifiers
- Aliases: NEDD8, NEDD-8, neural precursor cell expressed, developmentally down-regulated 8, NEDD8 ubiquitin like modifier
- External IDs: OMIM: 603171; MGI: 97301; GeneCards: NEDD8
Available structures
PDB	Ortholog search: PDBe RCSB
PDB	List of PDB id codes 1NDD, 1R4M, 1R4N, 1XT9, 2BKR, 2KO3, 2NVU, 3DBH, 3DBL, 3DBR, 3DQV, 3GZN, 4F8C, 4FBJ, 4HCP, 4P5O

Gene location (Human)
Chr.	Chromosome 14 (human)
Band	14q12	Start	24,216,857 bp
Band	14q12	End	24,232,367 bp

Gene location (Mouse)
Chr.	Chromosome 14 (mouse)
Band	14 C3|14 28.19 cM	Start	55,899,720 bp
Band	14 C3|14 28.19 cM	End	55,909,581 bp
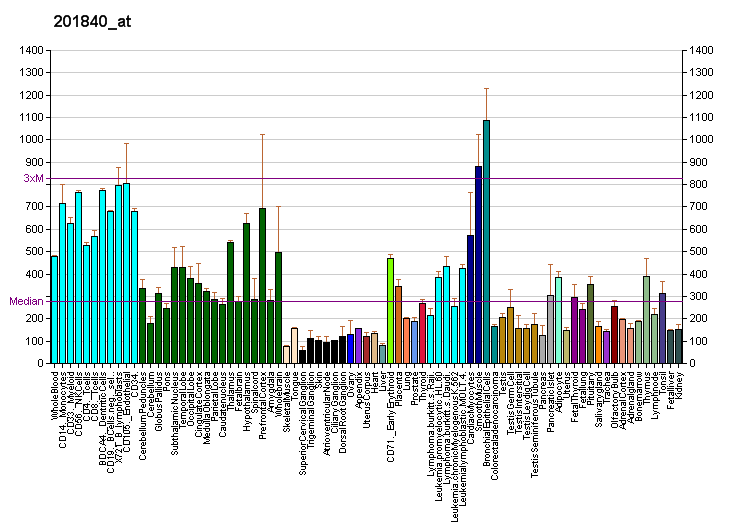
RNA expression pattern
Bgee	Human / Mouse (ortholog); Top expressed in: prefrontal cortex; superior frontal gyrus; right frontal lobe; anterior cingulate cortex; dorsolateral prefrontal cortex; nucleus accumbens; primary visual cortex; apex of heart; hypothalamus; caudate nucleus / Top expressed in: dentate gyrus of hippocampal formation granule cell; ventricular zone; somite; neural layer of retina; blastocyst; morula; superior frontal gyrus; embryo; maxillary prominence; epiblast; More reference expression data
BioGPS	More reference expression data
Gene ontology
Molecular function	protein binding; ubiquitin protein ligase binding; protein tag
Cellular component	cytosol; extracellular exosome; nucleus; nucleoplasm; cytoplasm
Biological process	protein localization; anatomical structure morphogenesis; transforming growth factor beta receptor signaling pathway; response to organic cyclic compound; ubiquitin-dependent protein catabolic process; proteolysis; protein neddylation; protein deubiquitination; cellular iron ion homeostasis; protein ubiquitination; post-translational protein modification; modification-dependent protein catabolic process; regulation of proteolysis
Sources:Amigo / QuickGO
Orthologs
Databases	NCBI: entry; OMA: entry
Species	Human	Mouse
Entrez	4738	18002
Ensembl	ENSG00000129559; ENSG00000285246	ENSMUSG00000010376
UniProt	Q15843	P29595
RefSeq (mRNA)	NM_006156	NM_008683
RefSeq (protein)	NP_006147	NP_032709
Location (UCSC)	Chr 14: 24.22 – 24.23 Mb	Chr 14: 55.9 – 55.91 Mb
PubMed search
- Wikidata
View/Edit Human	View/Edit Mouse

NEDD8 is a protein that in humans is encoded by the NEDD8 gene. (in Saccharomyces cerevisiae this protein is known as Rub1) This ubiquitin-like (UBL) protein becomes covalently conjugated to a limited number of cellular proteins, in a process called NEDDylation similar to ubiquitination. Human NEDD8 shares 60% amino acid sequence identity to ubiquitin. The primary known substrates of NEDD8 modification are the cullin subunits of cullin-based E3 ubiquitin ligases, which are active only when NEDDylated. Their NEDDylation is critical for the recruitment of E2 to the ligase complex, thus facilitating ubiquitin conjugation. NEDD8 modification has therefore been implicated in cell cycle progression and cytoskeletal regulation.

== Activation and conjugation ==
As with ubiquitin and SUMO, NEDD8 is conjugated to cellular proteins after its C-terminal tail is processed. The NEDD8 activating E1 enzyme is a heterodimer composed of APPBP1 and UBA3 subunits. The APPBP1/UBA3 enzyme has homology to the N- and C-terminal halves of the ubiquitin E1 enzyme, respectively. The UBA3 subunit contains the catalytic center and activates NEDD8 in an ATP-dependent reaction by forming a high-energy thiolester intermediate. The activated NEDD8 is subsequently transferred to the UbcH12 E2 enzyme, and is then conjugated to specific substrates in the presence of the appropriate E3 ligases.

== Substrates for NEDD8 ==
As reviewed by Brown et al., the best-characterized activated-NEDD8 substrates are the cullins (CUL1, 2, 3, 4A, 4B, 5, and 7 and PARC in human cells), that serve as molecular scaffolds for cullin-RING ubiquitin ligases (CRLs). Neddylation results in covalent conjugation of a NEDD8 moiety onto a conserved cullin lysine residue. Cullin neddylation increases CRL ubiquitylation activity via conformational changes that optimize ubiquitin transfer to target proteins

== Removal ==
There are several different proteases which can remove NEDD8 from protein conjugates. UCHL1, UCHL3 and USP21 proteases have dual specificity for NEDD8 and ubiquitin. Proteases specific for NEDD8 removal are the COP9 signalosome which removes NEDD8 from the CUL1 subunit of SCF ubiquitin ligases, and NEDP1 (or DEN1, SENP8).

== Role in DNA repair ==
As shown by Brown et al., NEDD8 accumulation at DNA-damage sites is a highly dynamic process. Neddylation is needed during a short period of the global genome repair (GGR) sub-pathway of DNA nucleotide excision repair (NER). In GGR of NER, after DNA damage is caused by UV irradiation, Cul4A in the DNA damage binding protein 2 (DDB2) complex is activated by NEDD8, and this allows GGR-NER to proceed to remove the damage.

Neddylation also has a role in repair of double-strand breaks. Non-homologous end joining(NHEJ) is a DNA repair pathway frequently used to repair DNA double-strand breaks. The first step in this pathway depends on the Ku70/Ku80 heterodimer that forms a highly stable ring structure encircling DNA ends. But the Ku heterodimer needs to be removed when NHEJ is completed, or it blocks transcription or replication. The Ku heterodimer is ubiquitylated in a DNA-damage and neddylation-dependent manner to promote the release of Ku and other NHEJ factors from the site of repair after the process is completed.

== In cancer chemotherapy ==
As discussed by Jin and Roberston in their review, silencing of a DNA repair gene by hypermethylation of its promoter may be a very early step in progression to cancer. Gene silencing of a DNA repair gene at the transcription level is proposed to act similarly to a germ-line mutation in a DNA repair gene. Loss of DNA repair capability by either mechanism introduces genome instability and predisposes the cell and its descendants to progression to cancer. Epigenetically silenced DNA repair genes occur frequently in the 17 most common cancers (see e.g. Frequency of hypermethylation of DNA repair genes in cancer).

As discussed above, activated-NEDD8 is needed in two DNA repair pathways: NER and NHEJ. If activation of NEDD8 is inhibited, cells with induced deficiency of NER or NHEJ may then die because of deficient DNA repair leading to accumulation of DNA damages. The effect of NEDD8 inhibition may be greater for cancer cells than for normal cells if the cancer cells are independently deficient in DNA repair due to prior epigenetic silencing of DNA repair genes active in alternative pathways (see synthetic lethality).

Pevonedistat (MLN4924), a drug inhibiting activation of NEDD8, has shown a significant therapeutic effect in four Phase I clinical cancer trials in 2015-2016. These include pevonedistat trials against acute myeloid leukemia and myelodysplastic syndromes, relapsed/refractory multiple myeloma or lymphoma, metastatic melanoma, and advanced solid tumors.

== In preclinical studies ==
=== PPARγ neddylation ===
PPARγ has a crucial role in adipogenesis and lipid accumulation within adipocytes (fat cells). Activated NEDD8 stabilizes PPARγ, allowing increased adipogenesis. In experiments with mice, Pevonedistat, a drug inhibiting activation of NEDD8, prevented high-fat diet-induced obesity and glucose intolerance.

=== NF-κB and NEDD8 ===
The transcriptional activity of NF-κB is primarily regulated by physical interaction with inhibitory IκB proteins (IκBα and IκBβ), which prevents its nuclear translocation. Degradation of the IκBα subunit of IκB is mediated by ubiquitination, and this ubiquitination depends on neddylation. Pevonedistat (MLN4924) inhibits activation of NEDD8, that then inhibits ubiquitination of IκBα, and this inhibits NF-κB translocation to the nucleus.

Pevonedistat, through its effects on NF-κB and a target of NF-κB (microRNA-155), prolonged the survival of mice engrafted with leukemic cells.

=== Colorectal cancer ===
Inhibition of NEDD8 activation by pevonedistat was found to induce growth arrest and apoptosis in 16/122 (13%) colorectal cancer (CRC) cell lines. Further analyses in patient-derived tumor xenografts revealed that pevonedistat is effective on poorly differentiated, high-grade mucinous CRC.

== Interactions ==
NEDD8 has been shown to interact with:

- Aryl hydrocarbon receptor,
- NUB1,
- UBE1C,
- UBE2M, and
- UCHL3.
