= RNF111 =

Protein-coding gene in the species Homo sapiens

Identifiers
- Aliases: RNF111, ARK, ring finger protein 111, hRNF111
- External IDs: OMIM: 605840; MGI: 1934919; GeneCards: RNF111
Available structures
PDB	Ortholog search: PDBe RCSB
PDB	List of PDB id codes 2KIZ
Enzyme activity
EC #	BRENDA	ExPASy	KEGG	MetaCyc
2.3.2.27	↗	↗	↗	↗

Gene location (Human)
Chr.	Chromosome 15 (human)
Band	15q22.1-q22.2	Start	58,865,175 bp
Band	15q22.1-q22.2	End	59,097,419 bp

Gene location (Mouse)
Chr.	Chromosome 9 (mouse)
Band	9 D|9 39.53 cM	Start	70,332,706 bp
Band	9 D|9 39.53 cM	End	70,411,007 bp
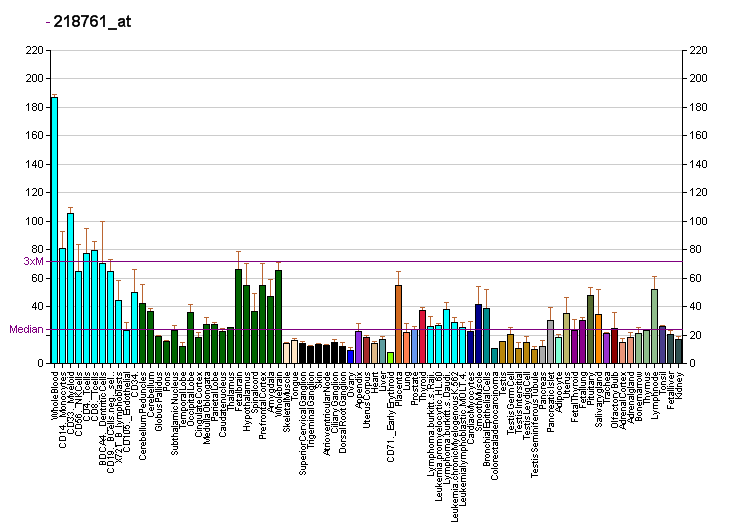
RNA expression pattern
Bgee	Human / Mouse (ortholog); Top expressed in: secondary oocyte; endothelial cell; monocyte; ganglionic eminence; Epithelium of choroid plexus; ventricular zone; epithelium of colon; stromal cell of endometrium; tonsil; sural nerve / Top expressed in: zygote; cumulus cell; secondary oocyte; granulocyte; primitive streak; blood; parotid gland; pineal gland; lymph node; aortic valve; More reference expression data
BioGPS	More reference expression data
Gene ontology
Molecular function	SUMO polymer binding; protein binding; metal ion binding; ubiquitin protein ligase activity; transferase activity; SMAD binding
Cellular component	nucleoplasm; nucleus; cytoplasm; cytosol; PML body; protein-containing complex
Biological process	positive regulation of transcription, DNA-templated; ubiquitin-dependent SMAD protein catabolic process; protein polyubiquitination; multicellular organism development; positive regulation of transforming growth factor beta receptor signaling pathway; positive regulation of protein ubiquitination; pattern specification process; proteasome-mediated ubiquitin-dependent protein catabolic process; protein ubiquitination; global genome nucleotide-excision repair; positive regulation of transcription by RNA polymerase II; DNA repair; cellular response to DNA damage stimulus; ubiquitin-dependent protein catabolic process
Sources:Amigo / QuickGO
Orthologs
Databases	NCBI: entry; OMA: entry
Species	Human	Mouse
Entrez	54778	93836
Ensembl	ENSG00000157450	ENSMUSG00000032217
UniProt	Q6ZNA4	Q99ML9
RefSeq (mRNA)	NM_001270528; NM_001270529; NM_001270530; NM_017610; NM_001330331	NM_033604; NM_001357494; NM_001374753
RefSeq (protein)	NP_001257457; NP_001257458; NP_001257459; NP_001317260; NP_060080	NP_291082; NP_001344423; NP_001361682
Location (UCSC)	Chr 15: 58.87 – 59.1 Mb	Chr 9: 70.33 – 70.41 Mb
PubMed search
- Wikidata
View/Edit Human	View/Edit Mouse

E3 ubiquitin-protein ligase Arkadia is an enzyme that in humans is encoded by the RNF111 gene.

== Function ==
The protein encoded by this gene contains a RING finger domain, a motif known to be involved in protein-protein and protein-DNA interactions. The mouse counterpart of this gene (Rnf111/arkadia) has been shown to genetically interact with the transforming growth factor (TGF) beta-like factor Nodal, and act as a modulator of the nodal signaling cascade, which is essential for the induction of mesoderm during embryonic development.

== Interactions ==
RNF111 has been shown to interact with Mothers against decapentaplegic homolog 7 and Mothers against decapentaplegic homolog 3.
