= UPF0602 =

Human gene

UPF0602 Protein C4orf47
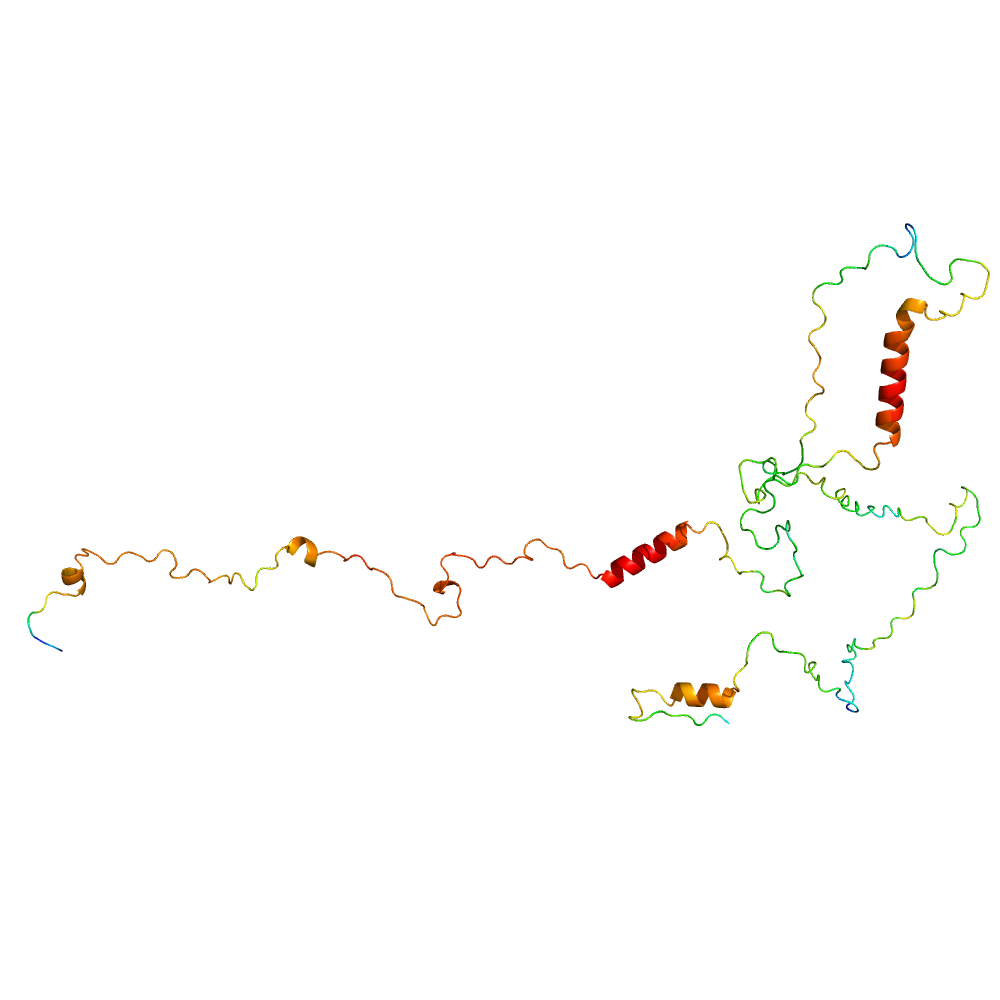
- AlphaFold prediction of UPF0602 protein c4orf47's tertiary structure

Identifiers
- Symbol: c4orf47
- Alt. symbols: LOC441054
- HGNC: 34346
- RefSeq: NM_00107829
- UniProt: A7E2U8

Other data
- Locus: Chr. 4 q35.1
Search for
- Structures: Swiss-model
- Domains: InterPro

UPF0602 is a protein in humans that is encoded by the chromosome 4 open reading frame 47 (c4orf47) gene.

== Gene ==
The c4orf47 gene is positioned at 4q35.1 on the plus strand and spans 44,602 base pairs in length (185,405,227...185,449,828). The gene is made up of 12 exons and 11 introns.

There is overlap with two other genes which reside on the negative strand. These genes are UFM1 specific peptidase 2 (UFSP2) and Coiled-coil domain containing 110 (CCDC110)

Another alias for the c4orf47 gene is LOC441054

== Transcript ==
Transcript variant 1 is the longest experimentally validated variant of c4orf47 mRNA and it encodes for UPF0602 protein isoform 1. This variant contains a total of 8 exons with an upstream in-frame stop codon located within the first exon, a disordered region, and a domain of unknown function. The mRNA is 1,333 nucleotides long and encodes for a 309 amino acid polypeptide.

Transcript variant 2 differs in the 5' UTR, uses an alternate translation start site, and lacks two alternate exons in the 5' coding region compared to variant 1. The encoded protein isoform (2) is shorter and has a distinct N-terminus compared to protein isoform 1. The mRNA is 1,037 nucleotides long and encodes for a 183 amino acid polypeptide.

C4orf47 mRNA is ubiquitously expressed in all tissue, with higher expression occurring within the choroid plexus, retina, fallopian tubes, and testis.

== Protein ==
UPF0602 protein isoform 1 has a molecular weight of 34.4kDa and a predicted isoelectric point of 9.64 pI. It contains the domain of unknown function known as DUF4586. this domain belongs to pfam15239 which is the only member of protein superfamily cl21099.

This protein contains a higher than average quantity of basic amino acids relative to its size and contains two repeat sections.

Location	Amino Acids
145 - 148	PGKK
235 - 238	PGKK
164 - 168	SHSAD
252 - 256	SHSAD

=== Localization ===
This protein contains no signal peptide and has been shown to localize within the cell to cytoplasmic microtubules, centrosomes, and non-motile cilia.

=== Expression ===
UPF0602 is ubiquitously expressed in all tissue, with higher expression occurring within the lungs, fallopian tubes, and testis. The lungs and fallopian tubes see the greatest protein abundance within ciliated cells. Specifically in the tip of cilia and the cilia axoneme. Within the testis, protein abundance is highest in elongated or late spermatid.

== Homology ==
UPF0602 protein has no paralogs. However, homologs are found within most ciliated eukaryotes. Exceptions include all reptiles except turtles, salamanders, and lobe-finned fishes other than the West Indian Coelacanth. A UPF0602 protein homolog is also found within Chytridiomycetes, a class of fungi.

The following table represents a small selection of homologs found using BLAST.

Genus and species	Common name	Taxonomic group	Estimated Divergence (MYA)	Accession number	Sequence length (aa)	Sequence identity (%)	Sequence similarity (%)
Homo sapiens	Human	Primates	0	NP_001107829.1	309	100	100
Gallus gallus	Domestic chicken	Aves	312	XP_004936032.2	311	67.2	78.8
Chrysemys picta bellii	Painted turtle	Reptilia	312	XP_005282053.1	311	66.6	79.7
Rhinatrema bivittatum	Two-lined caecilian	Amphibia	351.8	XP_029442782.1	308	61.1	74.3
Xenophus tropicalis	Western clawed frog	Amphibia	351.8	XP_002934310.1	307	58.3	75.1
Latimeria chalumnae	West Indian coelacanth	Coelacanthiformes	413	XP_014353738.1	311	55	70.4
Danio rerio	Zebrafish	Actinopterygii	435	NP_001038879.1	312	54.5	70.2
Rhinocodon typus	Whale shark	Chondrichthyes	473	XP_020367910.1	319	50.2	63.3
Lytechinus variegatus	Green sea urchin	Temnopleuroida	684	XP_041485424.1	316	52.8	67.1
Pomacea canaliculata	Channeled applesnail	Mollusca	797	XP_025090509.1	321	51.1	67
Amphibalanus amphitrite	Acorn barnacle	Arthropoda	797	KAF0292396.1	334	30.8	47.9
Powellomyces hirtus	Chytrids	Chytridiomycetes	1017	TPX58729.1	353	32.3	45.3

=== Evolution ===
The c4orf47 gene has been evolving at a relatively slow rate when compared to the evolutionary rates of Fibrinogen Alpha and Cytochrome C. This suggests there is a conserved function for the encoded protein.

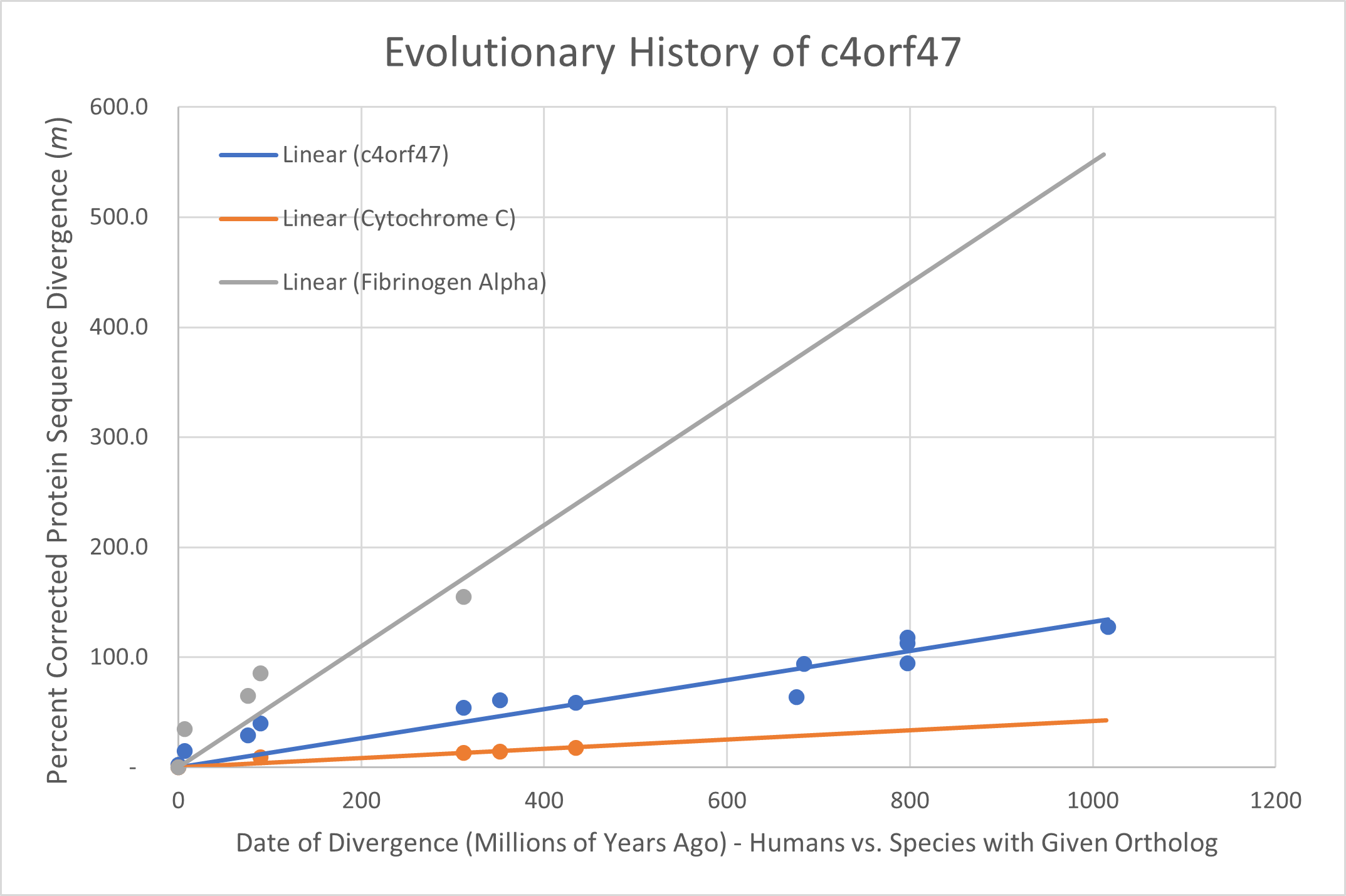
Graph showing UPF0602 protein c4orf47's evolutionary history

== Function ==
The function this protein carries out within the cell are not well understood by the scientific community, however evidence suggests it is related to cilia and flagella assembly.

=== Interacting proteins ===
High throughput evidence supports physical interaction between UPF0602 protein and nucleophosmin (NPM1), as well as with ubiquitin-specific peptidase 9, Y-linked (USP9Y).

== Clinical significance ==
Single nucleotide polymorphisms (SNPs) within regions of the UFSP2 gene overlapping c4orf47 have been linked to Beukes hip dysplasia, Spondyloepimetaphyseal dysplasia, Di Rocco type, microcephaly, and other developmental anomalies.
