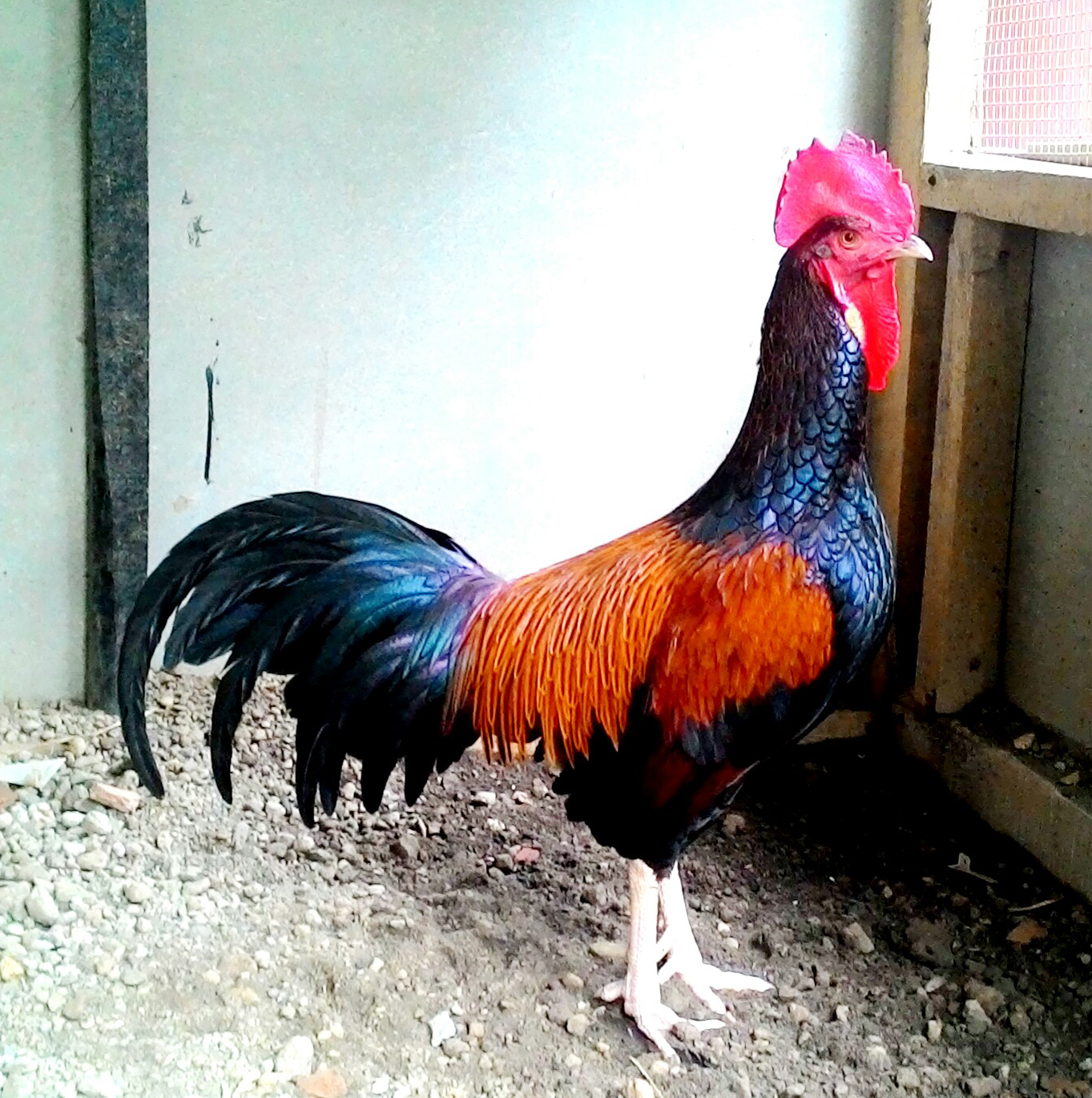

Scientific classification
- Kingdom: Animalia
- Phylum: Chordata
- Class: Aves
- Order: Galliformes
- Family: Phasianidae
- Tribe: Gallini
- Genus: Gallus
- Species: G. varius × G. gallus

= Bekisar =

Species of bird

The Bekisar, or Ayam Bekisar, is the first-generation hybrid offspring of the green junglefowl (Gallus varius) and domesticated red junglefowl from Java (Gallus gallus bankiva). The roosters have a glossy blackish-green plumage and are highly prized for their loud clear calls and striking colouration, while the hens are usually dull and infertile.

Bekisars were traditionally used by the original inhabitants of the Sunda Islands as symbolic or spiritual mascots on outrigger canoes and consequently spread over a wide area. The original hybrids are rarely fertile (and hens are generally sterile), but backcrosses with domestic chicken are sometimes achieved and thus several landraces of Pacific chickens have some Bekisar ancestry. While the hybrid is only of historical interest in most regions, on Java it is still being produced as a more stereotyped breed with several local varieties, known as Ayam Bekisar.

== History ==
=== Background ===
The wild green junglefowl is a mangrove forest-adapted species. Unlike the red junglefowl, the ancestor of most domestic chickens, it is adapted for life with little fresh water. During the dry season, and also on arid volcanic islands, the green junglefowl gets most of its water from dew in the coastal fog on fruits and insects. It also feeds on aquatic animals washed up on the shores and littoral pools, which red junglefowl are unable to do. At low tide, green junglefowl forage for starfish, small crabs, copepods, and detritus. At high tide, they fly to mangrove islets to roost. The far-carrying cries of the male green junglefowl can be heard over the breakers, even though their calls' volume is quite low in comparison to that of a domestic fowl or red junglefowl.

=== Hybridisation ===
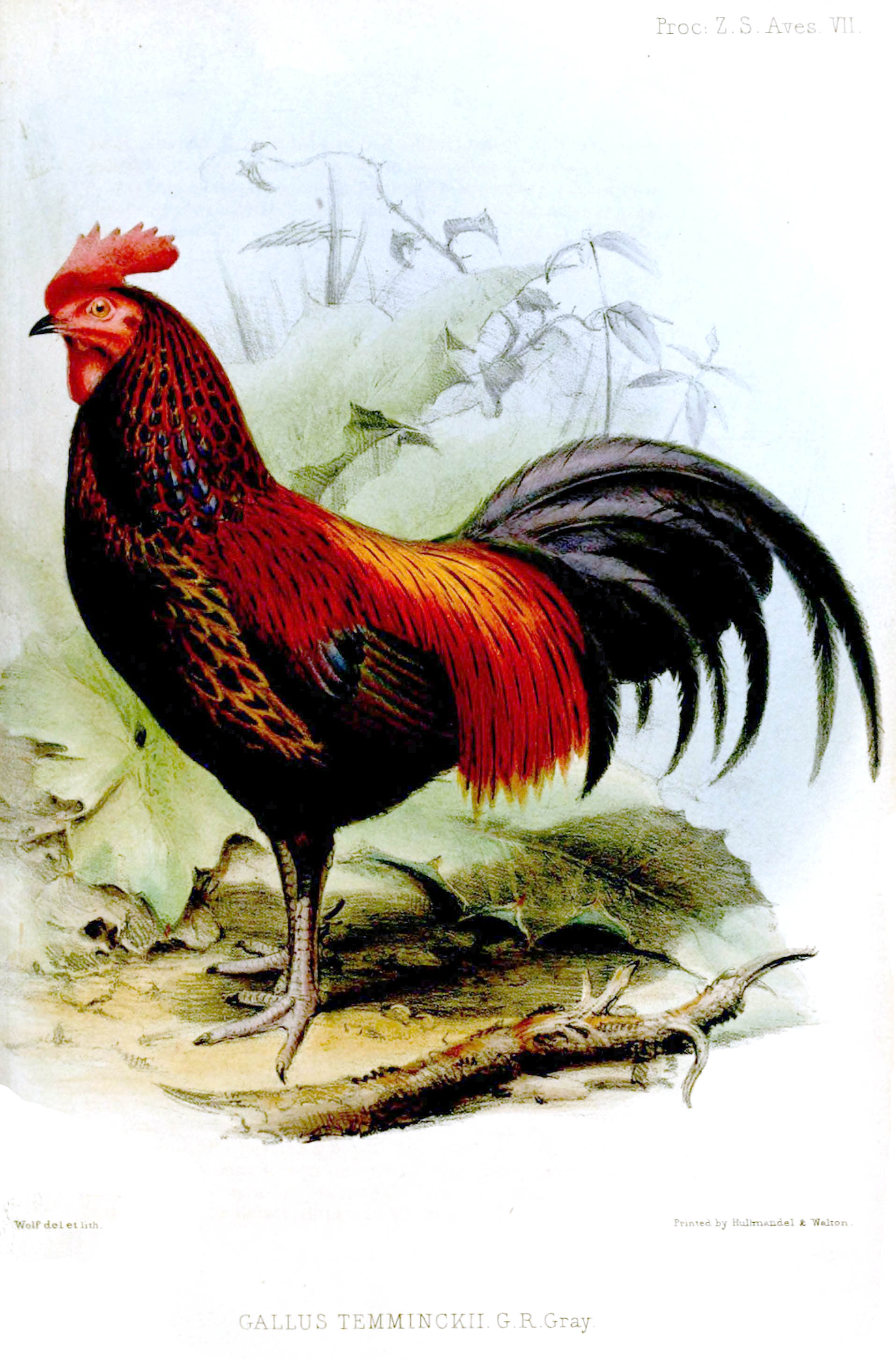
temminckii-type Ayam Bekisar

The practice of hybridisation is so ancient that it is not known precisely where it began. Modern Sundanese and Javanese people claim that it first occurred in the Kangean Islands in the Java Sea. The native peoples of the Sunda Archipelago learned that they could persuade young, unpaired wild green junglefowl males to mate with domestic game hens.

=== Development ===
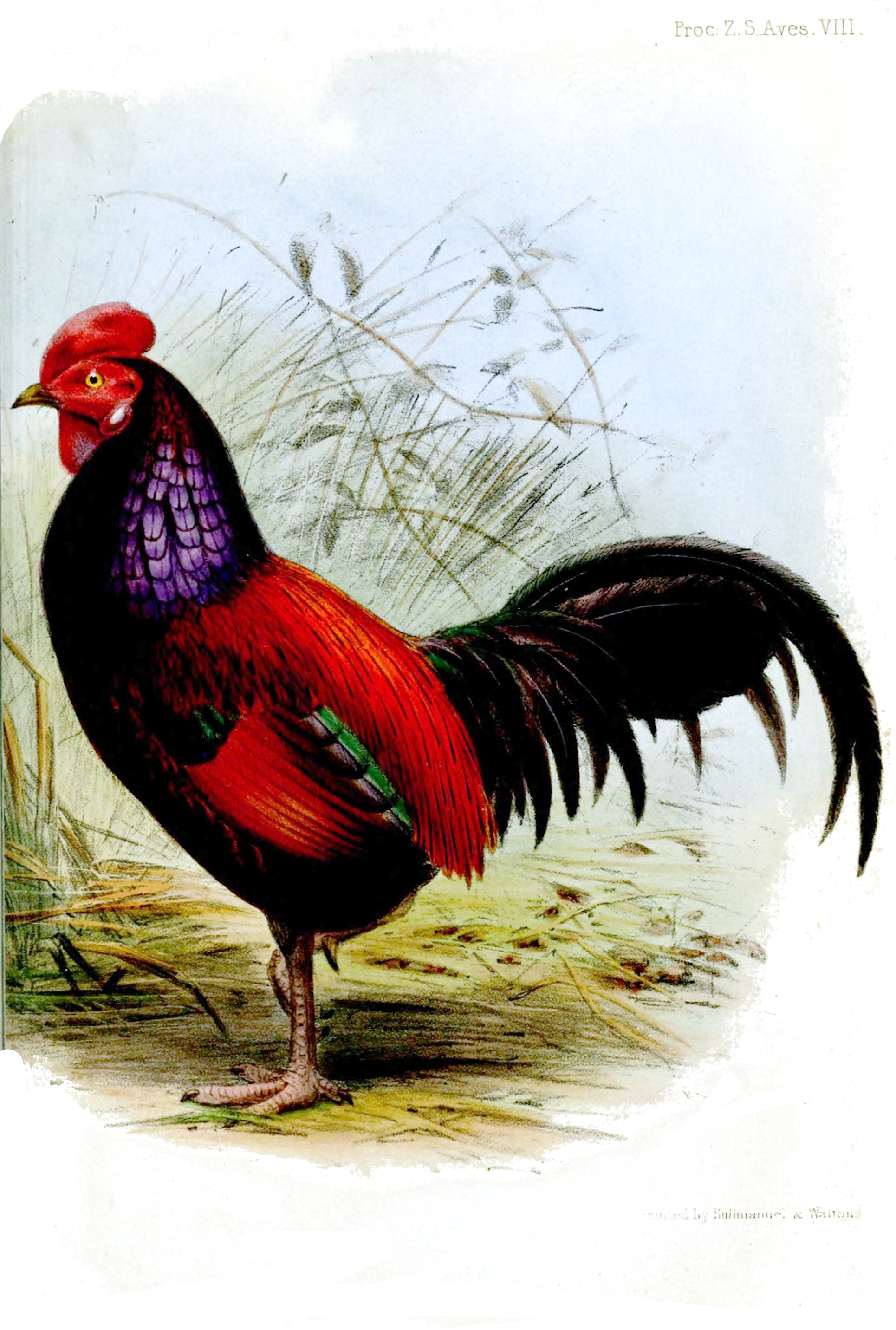
æneus-type Ayam Bekisar

The progeny were used for communication between canoes. Each rooster has a unique voice, due to its hybrid ancestry. A rooster would be selected for its unusual voice and hoisted up the mast of the canoe in a special bamboo basket. From their elevated baskets, the roosters crowed incessantly in prolonged shrieking matches. The calls combine the prolonged notes of the green junglefowl with the added volume of domestic fowl, whose wild ancestors' voices had to be heard through dense vegetation. The Bekisar's voice can often be heard for two miles over the sea. The seafaring cultures took to keeping these male Bekisars on their canoes at all times.

The infertile female hybrids were previously killed.

=== Spread ===
When the native peoples of Java and the Sunda Islands migrated to Oceania and beyond, they brought with them dogs, pigs, yams, coconuts, and chickens. Each migration brought a few dozen semi-domestic game fowl, not unlike those seen today running feral in tropical Asian villages. Anthropologists have provided evidence that only a very few boats in any flotilla carried domestic animals. Each seafaring vessel would, however, have carried at least two or three cages with Bekisars aboard. The chieftain and warriors may have carried even more Bekisars on each of their vessels.

Nearly every new migration of seafaring people brought game fowl (the semi-domestic chickens descended from the Indonesian red junglefowl Gallus bankiva) to their new island homes. The Bekisar roosters were also present in sufficient numbers to significantly affect each island's native base population of feral fowl. An escaped Bekisar was next to impossible to capture. A Bekisar rooster released into a tropical mangrove forested island in Oceania or the South Pacific would easily re-adapt to the wild as if it were a wild green junglefowl.

=== Establishment of feral populations ===
Many of the more remote, typhoon-prone islands with very small or failed human colonies are the naturalized homes of wild junglefowl, described as violet-colored junglefowl by early European naturalists and considered a new species. Backcrossing of many generations of the hybrid Bekisar males with feral domestic game hens must occur before fertile females are produced. Female hybrid offspring of green junglefowl crossed with domestic fowl are always sterile, laying eggs that are incapable of being fertilized by either green or red junglefowl, or by domestic fowl. This means that backcrossing would be a common mode of self-perpetuation.

When competing clans, tribal wars, disease, and typhoons extirpated or very nearly exterminated human populations or forced migrations, feral fowl, pigs, and dogs would often remain on these remote islands. Natural predators such as monitor lizards, seabirds, pythons, and other predators would hunt out the feral chickens with the most domesticated traits. Those incapable of flying or running rapidly would not live long enough to reproduce. Those incapable of surviving long periods without fresh water would also perish, and those lacking the appropriate instincts to survive frequent typhoons would also be selected against.

=== Local adaptation ===
The Bekisar, with the progeny they generated by interbreeding with feral chickens, have adapted to local conditions. With each successive generation of backcrossing, the odds of a fertile hybrid female increase. At a certain point a genetic equilibrium is reached, and a fresh generation of viable females, capable of reproducing, is produced. Over the long run, some of the more remote islands, such as New Caledonia, Ponape, Marquesas, Rapa, and Rapa Nui, became populated with flocks unique in appearance, not closely resembling either parental form.

When successive migrations of Polynesians carrying domestic fowl (derived from red junglefowl) appeared on these islands, most of the violaceous traits vanished through genetic swamping, only persisting on the most isolated islands. From these isolated island populations, unique breeds have developed, in particular on Ponape, the Marquesas and Rapa Nui (Easter Island). The famous Araucana hens, named after the Araucanian Indians of Chile, are derived from these breeds. These breeds produce tinted blue, grey, lilac and green eggs. The green junglefowl is the only species of junglefowl that produces tinted eggs.

== Description ==
The bekisar dominantly inherits a single throat wattle from the green waterfowl over the double wattle from chickens.

== In popular culture ==
The Bekisar is the faunal symbol of East Java, a province of Indonesia. The male is used in East Java, Bali and the surrounding islands in popular vocal competitions, which may involve gambling; this breeding practice has caused the decline of wild green junglefowl populations.

== Bibliography ==
- Beebe, William. Monograph of the Phasianidae.
- Blackwood, Kermit. Ayam Bekisar.
- Grouw, Hein van & Dekkers, Wim (2019). Various Gallus varius hybrids: variation in junglefowl and Darwin's interest in them. Bulletin of the British Ornithologists' Club (London), 139 (4), 355–371.
