= UFC1 =

UFC1 may refer to:

- Ubiquitin-fold modifier conjugating enzyme 1 (UFC1), a protein involved in the ufmylation cascade
- UFC 1, the first mixed martial arts event organized by the Ultimate Fighting Championship
