= UFM1 =

Protein-coding gene in the species Homo sapiens

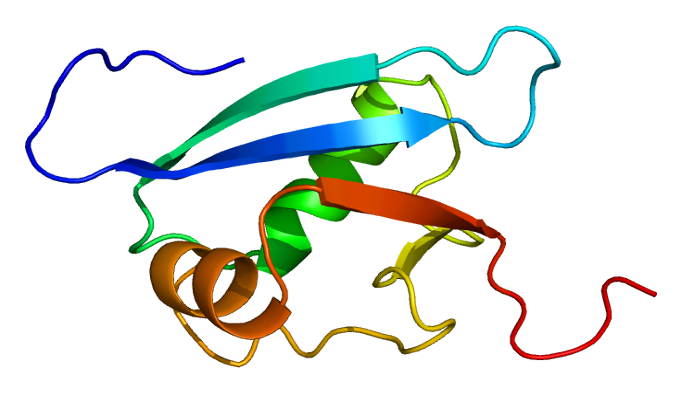

Identifiers
- Aliases: UFM1, BM-002, C13orf20, ubiquitin-fold modifier 1, ubiquitin fold modifier 1, HLD14
- External IDs: OMIM: 610553; MGI: 1915140; GeneCards: UFM1
Available structures
PDB	Ortholog search: PDBe RCSB
PDB	List of PDB id codes 1WXS, 5HKH

Gene location (Human)
Chr.	Chromosome 13 (human)
Band	13q13.3	Start	38,349,849 bp
Band	13q13.3	End	38,363,619 bp

Gene location (Mouse)
Chr.	Chromosome 3 (mouse)
Band	3|3 C	Start	53,760,797 bp
Band	3|3 C	End	53,771,251 bp
RNA expression pattern
Bgee	Human / Mouse (ortholog); Top expressed in: corpus epididymis; Epithelium of choroid plexus; caput epididymis; seminal vesicula; internal globus pallidus; tail of epididymis; body of pancreas; Achilles tendon; endometrium; sperm / Top expressed in: right kidney; ventricular zone; embryo; embryo; yolk sac; lip; morula; muscle of thigh; superior frontal gyrus; cardiac muscle tissue of left ventricle; More reference expression data
BioGPS	n/a
Gene ontology
Molecular function	protein binding
Cellular component	cytoplasm; nucleus; endoplasmic reticulum
Biological process	regulation of intracellular estrogen receptor signaling pathway; protein K69-linked ufmylation; response to endoplasmic reticulum stress; protein ufmylation; negative regulation of apoptotic process; brain development
Sources:Amigo / QuickGO
Orthologs
Databases	NCBI: entry; OMA: entry
Species	Human	Mouse
Entrez	51569	67890
Ensembl	ENSG00000120686	ENSMUSG00000027746
UniProt	P61960	P61961
RefSeq (mRNA)	NM_001286703; NM_001286704; NM_001286705; NM_001286706; NM_016617	NM_026435
RefSeq (protein)	NP_001273632; NP_001273633; NP_001273634; NP_001273635; NP_057701	NP_080711
Location (UCSC)	Chr 13: 38.35 – 38.36 Mb	Chr 3: 53.76 – 53.77 Mb
PubMed search
- Wikidata
View/Edit Human	View/Edit Mouse

Ubiquitin-fold modifier 1, also known as UFM1, is a protein which in humans is encoded by the UFM1 gene.

UFM1 is a ubiquitin-like protein that is conjugated to target proteins by E1-like activating enzyme UBA5 and E2-like conjugating enzyme UFC1. This process is often referred to as UFMylation.

== Function ==
UFM1 shares several common properties with ubiquitin (Ub) and the other ubiquitin-like proteins (UBLs). Ufm1 has similar tertiary structure to Ub but lacks any obvious sequence similarity. It is synthesized as an inactive precursor form (pro-Ufm1) which has 2 additional amino acids beyond the conserved glycine. The mechanism of Ufm1 conjugation is similar to that of ubiquitin. Mature Ufm1 has an exposed C-terminal glycine which is essential for subsequent activation by its cognate E1 protein (Uba5). This activation step results in the formation of a high-energy thiolester bond in the presence of ATP. The Ufm1 is subsequently transferred to its cognate E2-like enzyme (Ufc1) via a similar thioester linkage with a cysteine at the E2 active site. Ufm1 is conjugated to a variety of target proteins and forms complexes with as yet unidentified proteins. Thus, presumably there exist E3 ligases (none have been identified to date) to perform the final step in Ufm1 conjugation to relevant targets. The modification of proteins with Ufm1 is also reversible. Two novel cysteine proteases have been identified to date (UFSP1 and UFSP2) which cleave Ufm1-peptide C-terminal fusions and also removes Ufm1 from native intracellular conjugates. These proteases have no obvious homology to ubiquitin deconjugating enzymes. The proteins for Ufm1 conjugation (Uba5, Ufc1 and Ufm1) are all conserved in animals and plants (but not yeast) suggesting important roles in multicellular organisms. The exact role of Ufm1 modification in vivo is not yet known, but the primary target appear to be uL24/RPL26 in human cells.
