= UFSP1 =

Protein-coding gene in the species Homo sapiens

Identifiers
- Aliases: UFSP1, UFSP, UFM1-specific peptidase 1 (inactive), UFM1 specific peptidase 1 (inactive)
- External IDs: OMIM: 611481; MGI: 1917490; HomoloGene: 80245; GeneCards: UFSP1; OMA:UFSP1 - orthologs

Gene location (Human)
Chr.	Chromosome 7 (human)
Band	7q22.1	Start	100,888,721 bp
Band	7q22.1	End	100,889,715 bp

Gene location (Mouse)
Chr.	Chromosome 5 (mouse)
Band	5 G2|5 76.33 cM	Start	137,292,891 bp
Band	5 G2|5 76.33 cM	End	137,293,927 bp
RNA expression pattern
Bgee	Human / Mouse (ortholog); Top expressed in: gonad; muscle of thigh; stromal cell of endometrium; gastrocnemius muscle; mucosa of transverse colon; right adrenal cortex; granulocyte; left adrenal cortex; skeletal muscle tissue; right lobe of liver / Top expressed in: bone marrow; quadriceps femoris muscle; skeletal muscle tissue; proximal tubule; muscle of thigh; thoracic diaphragm; striatum of neuraxis; neural layer of retina; hypothalamus; muscle of arm; More reference expression data
BioGPS	n/a
Gene ontology
Molecular function	UFM1 hydrolase activity; cysteine-type peptidase activity; molecular function
Cellular component	extracellular exosome
Biological process	proteolysis; biological process
Sources:Amigo / QuickGO
Orthologs
Species	Human	Mouse
Entrez	402682	70240
Ensembl	ENSG00000176125	ENSMUSG00000051502
UniProt	Q6NVU6	Q9CZP0
RefSeq (mRNA)	NM_001015072	NM_027356
RefSeq (protein)	NP_001015072	NP_081632
Location (UCSC)	Chr 7: 100.89 – 100.89 Mb	Chr 5: 137.29 – 137.29 Mb
PubMed search
- Wikidata
View/Edit Human	View/Edit Mouse

UFM1 specific peptidase 1 (inactive) is a protein that in humans is encoded by the UFSP1 gene.

== Function ==
This gene encodes a protein that is similar to other Ufm1-specific proteases. Studies in mouse determined that Ufsp1 releases Ufm1 (ubiquitin-fold modifier 1) from its bound conjugated complexes which also makes it into an active form. Because the human UFSP1 protein is shorter on the N-terminus and lacks a conserved Cys active site, it is predicted to be non-functional.[provided by RefSeq, Nov 2009].
