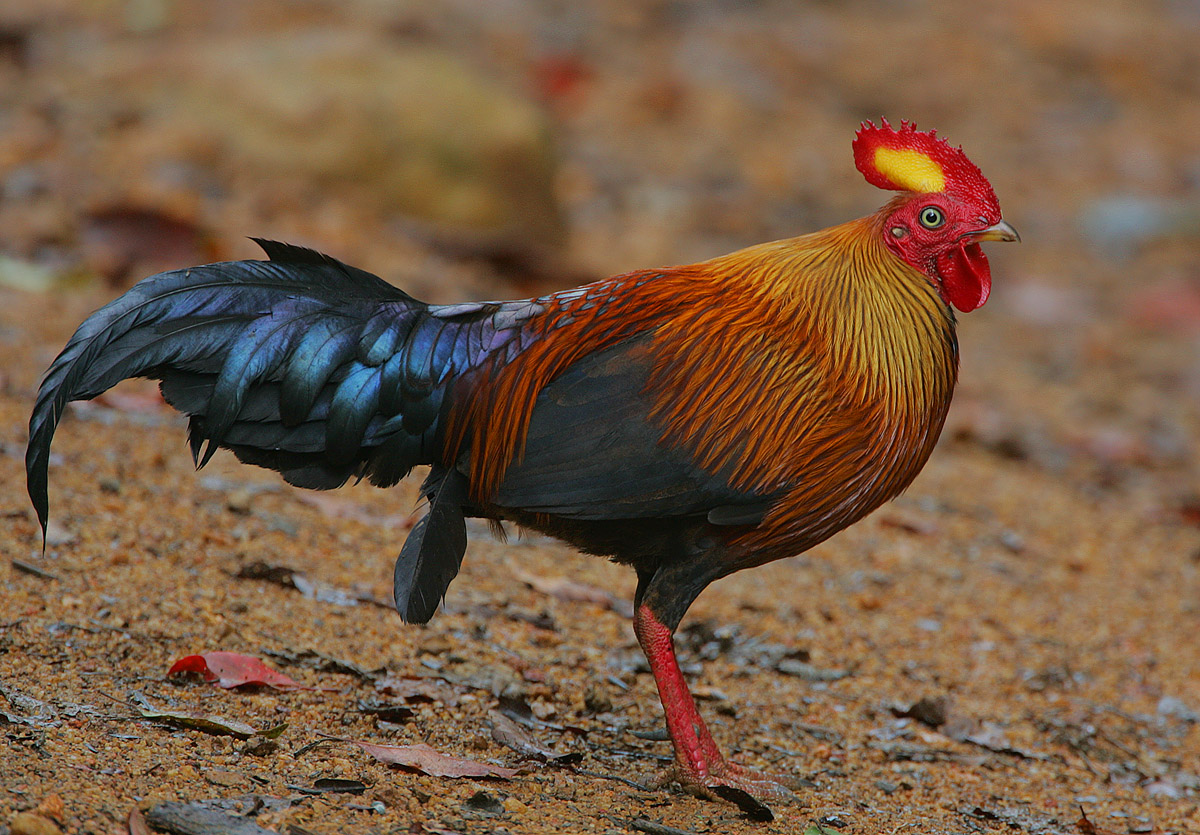
- Male (cock)
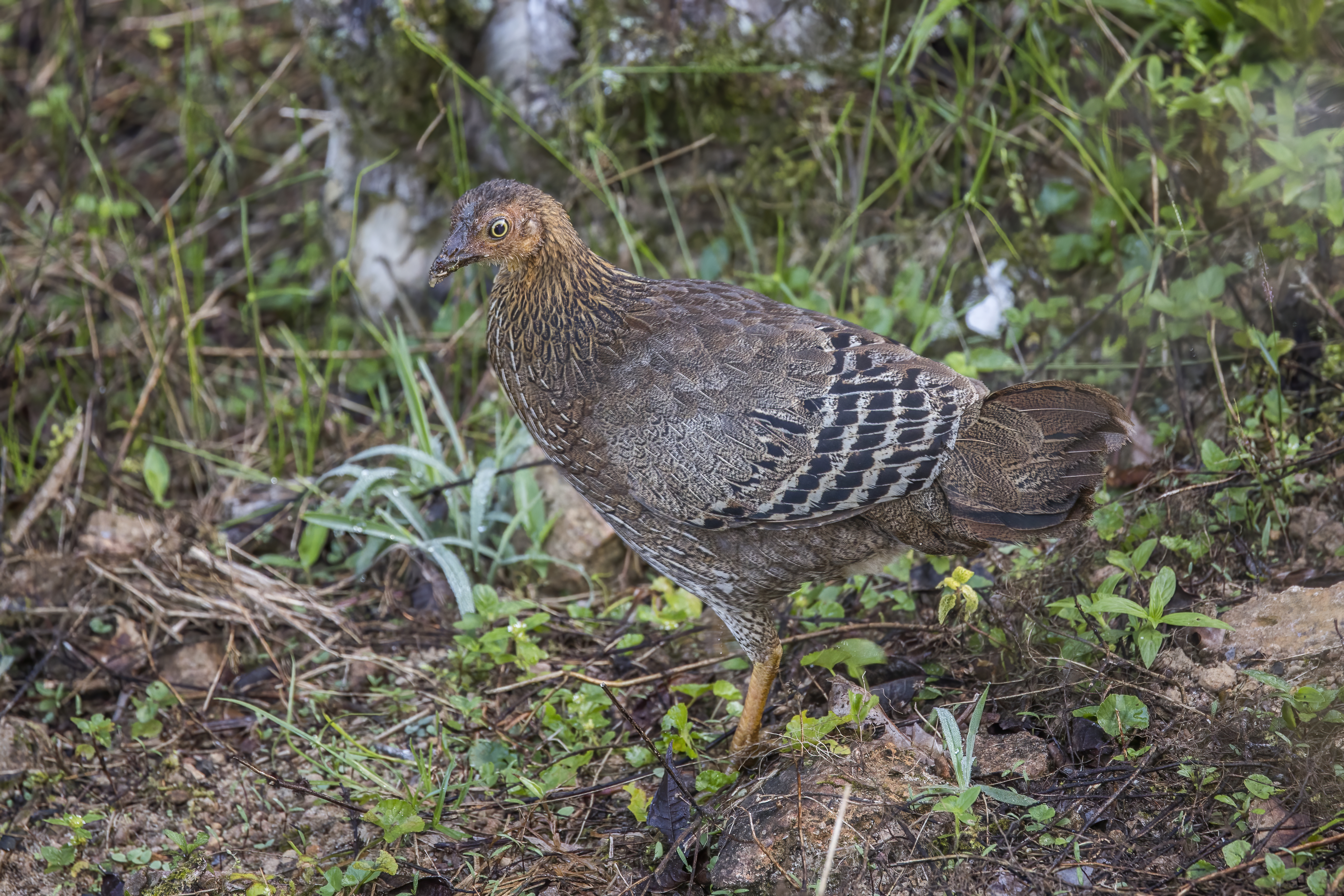
- Female (hen) both in Sinharaja Forest Reserve, Sri Lanka

Conservation status
- Least Concern (IUCN 3.1)

Scientific classification
- Kingdom: Animalia
- Phylum: Chordata
- Class: Aves
- Order: Galliformes
- Family: Phasianidae
- Genus: Gallus
- Species: G. lafayettii

Binomial name
- Gallus lafayettii Lesson, 1831
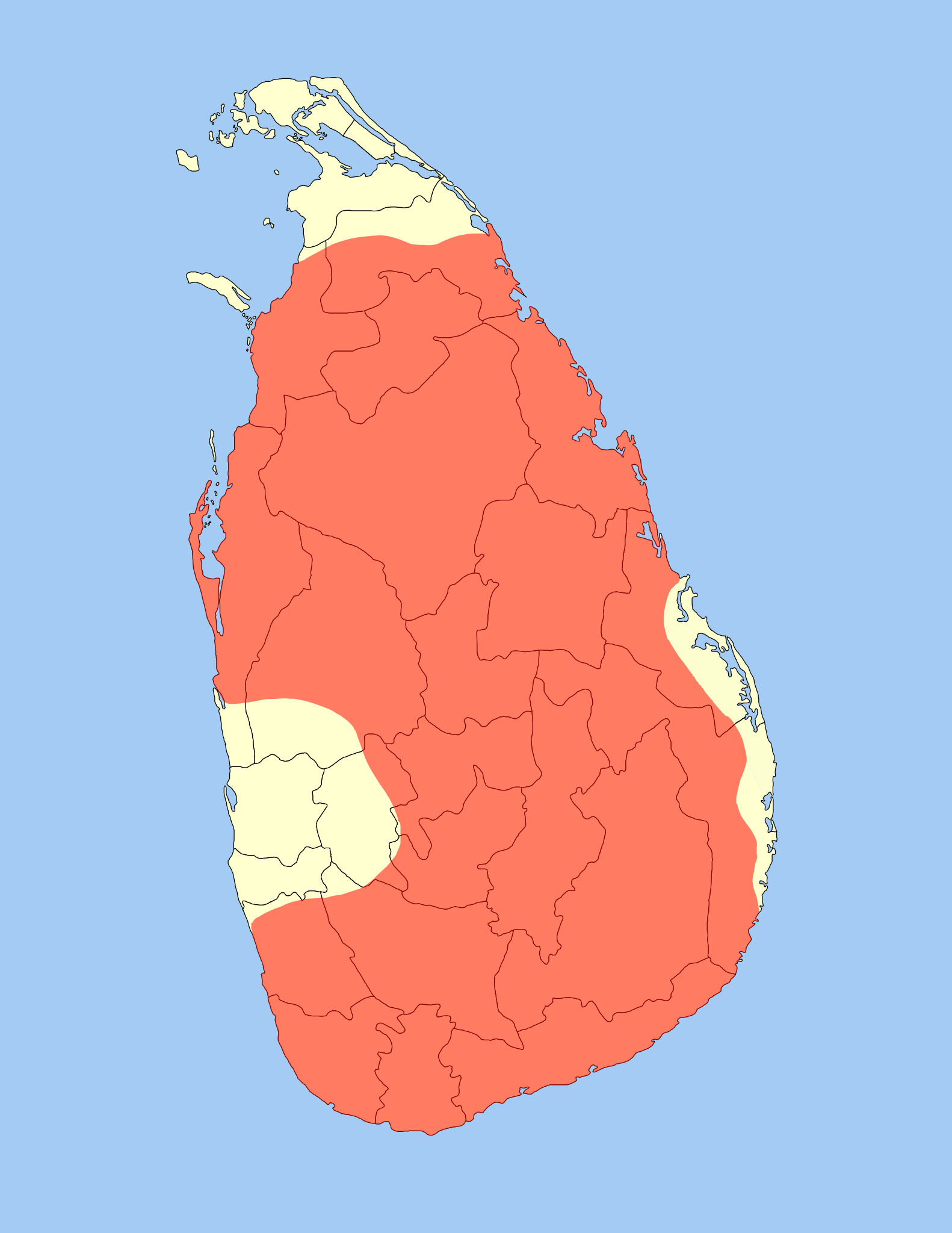

= Sri Lankan junglefowl =

Species of bird

The Sri Lankan junglefowl (Gallus lafayettii), also known as the Ceylon junglefowl or Lafayette's junglefowl, is a member of the Galliformes bird order. It is a common endemic bird in Sri Lanka, where it is the national bird. It is closely related to the red junglefowl (G. gallus), the wild junglefowl from which the chicken was domesticated. However, it is even more closely related to the gray junglefowl. Sri Lankan junglefowl and red junglefowl diverged about 2.8 million years ago, whereas time of divergence between the Sri Lankan junglefowl and grey junglefowl was 1.8 million years ago.

Evidence of introgressive hybridization from Sri Lanka junglefowl has also been established in domestic chicken. The specific name of the Sri Lankan junglefowl commemorates the French aristocrat Gilbert du Motier, marquis de La Fayette (1757–1834).

== Description ==
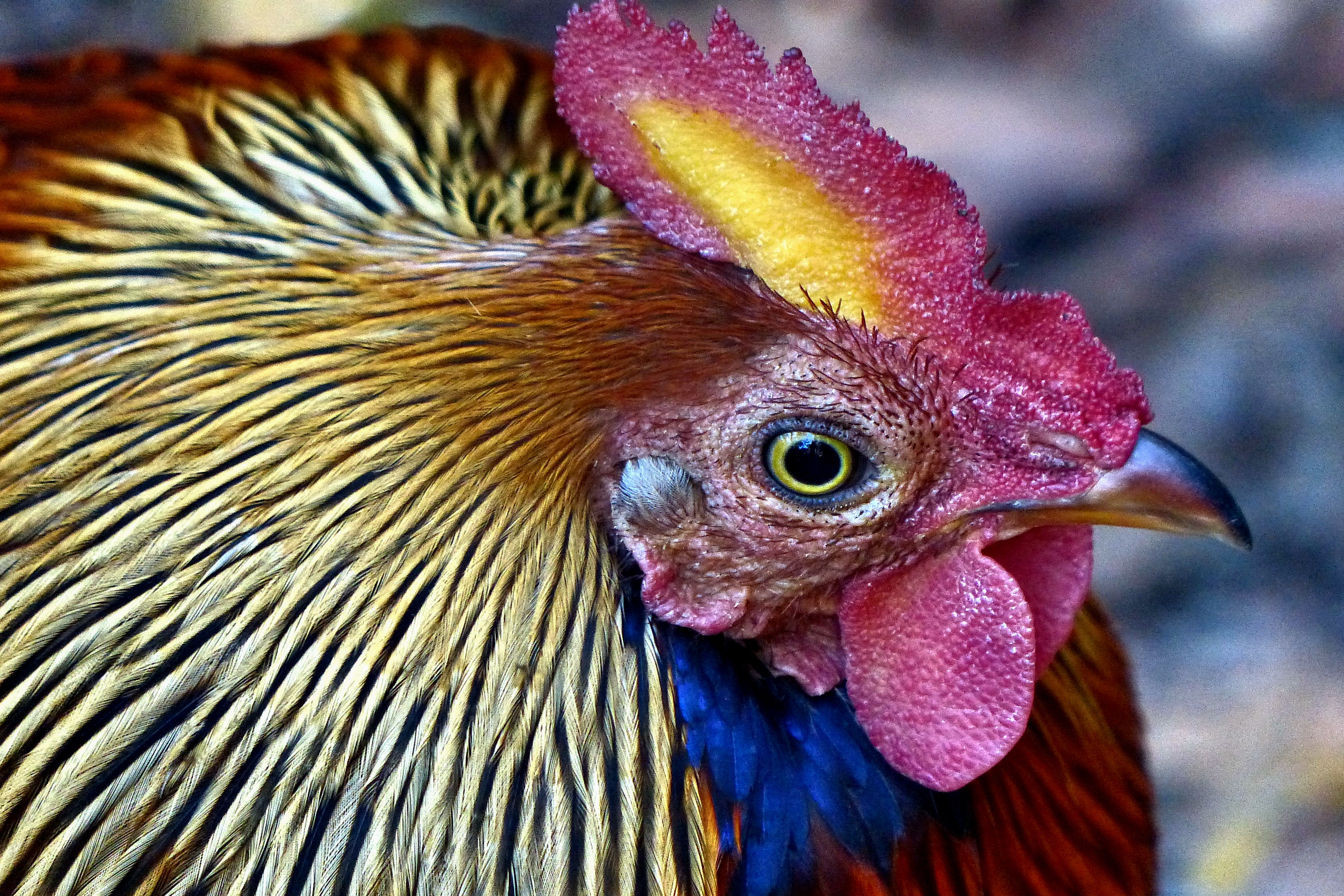

As with other junglefowl, the Sri Lankan junglefowl is strongly sexually dimorphic; the male is much larger than the female, with more vivid plumage and a highly exaggerated wattle and comb.

The male Sri Lankan junglefowl ranges from 66–72 cm (26–28 in) in length and 790–1,140 g (1.74–2.51 lb) in weight, essentially resembling a large, muscular rooster. The male has orange-red body plumage, and dark purple to black wings and tail. The feathers of the mane descending from head to base of spine are golden, and the face has bare red skin and wattles. The comb is red with a yellow centre. As with the green junglefowl, cock birds doesn't possess an eclipse plumage.

The female is much smaller, at only 35 cm (14 in) in length and 510–645 g (1.124–1.422 lb) in weight, with dull brown plumage with white patterning on the lower belly and breast, ideal camouflage for a nesting bird.

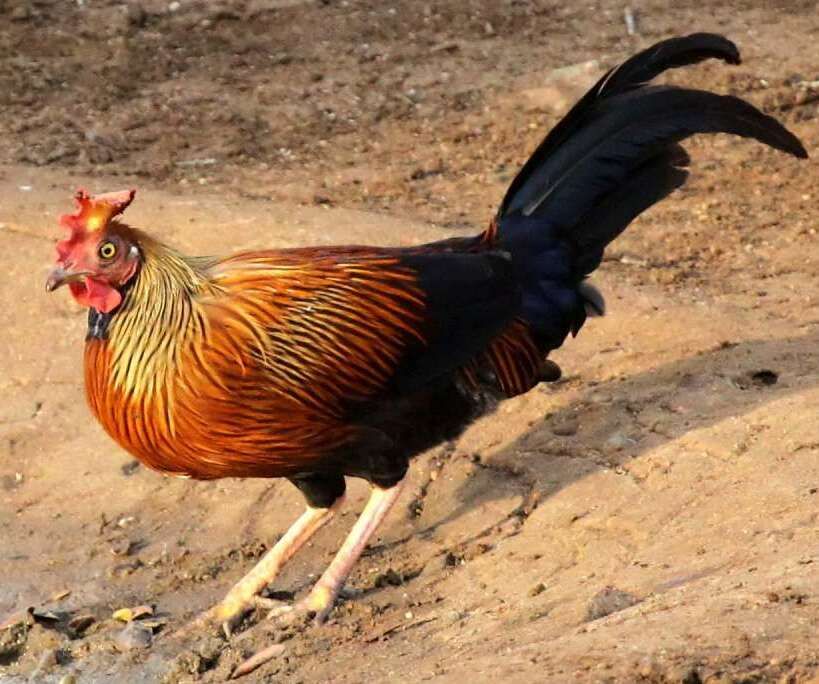

== Classification ==
This is one of four species of birds in the genus Gallus. The other three members of the genus are red junglefowl (G. gallus), grey junglefowl (G. sonneratii), and green junglefowl (G. varius).

- Gallus
  - Green junglefowl–Gallus varius (Shaw, 1798)
  - - Red junglefowl–Gallus gallus (Linnaeus, 1758)
    - - Sri Lankan junglefowl–Gallus lafayettii (Lesson, 1831)
      - Grey junglefowl–Gallus sonneratii (Temminck, 1813)

Cladogram showing the species in the genus Gallus.

The Sri Lankan junglefowl is most closely related to the grey junglefowl, though physically the male resembles the red junglefowl. Female Sri Lankan junglefowl are very similar to those of the grey junglefowl. Like the green junglefowl, Sri Lankan junglefowl are island species that have evolved side by side with their similarly stranded island predators and competitors. Uniquely complex anti-predator behaviors and foraging strategies are integral components in the long evolutionary story of the Sri Lankan junglefowl.

== Habitat ==
It is common in forests and scrub habitats, and is commonly spotted at sites such as Kitulgala, Yala, and Sinharaja. This species is found from sea-level up to 2000 metres of elevation.

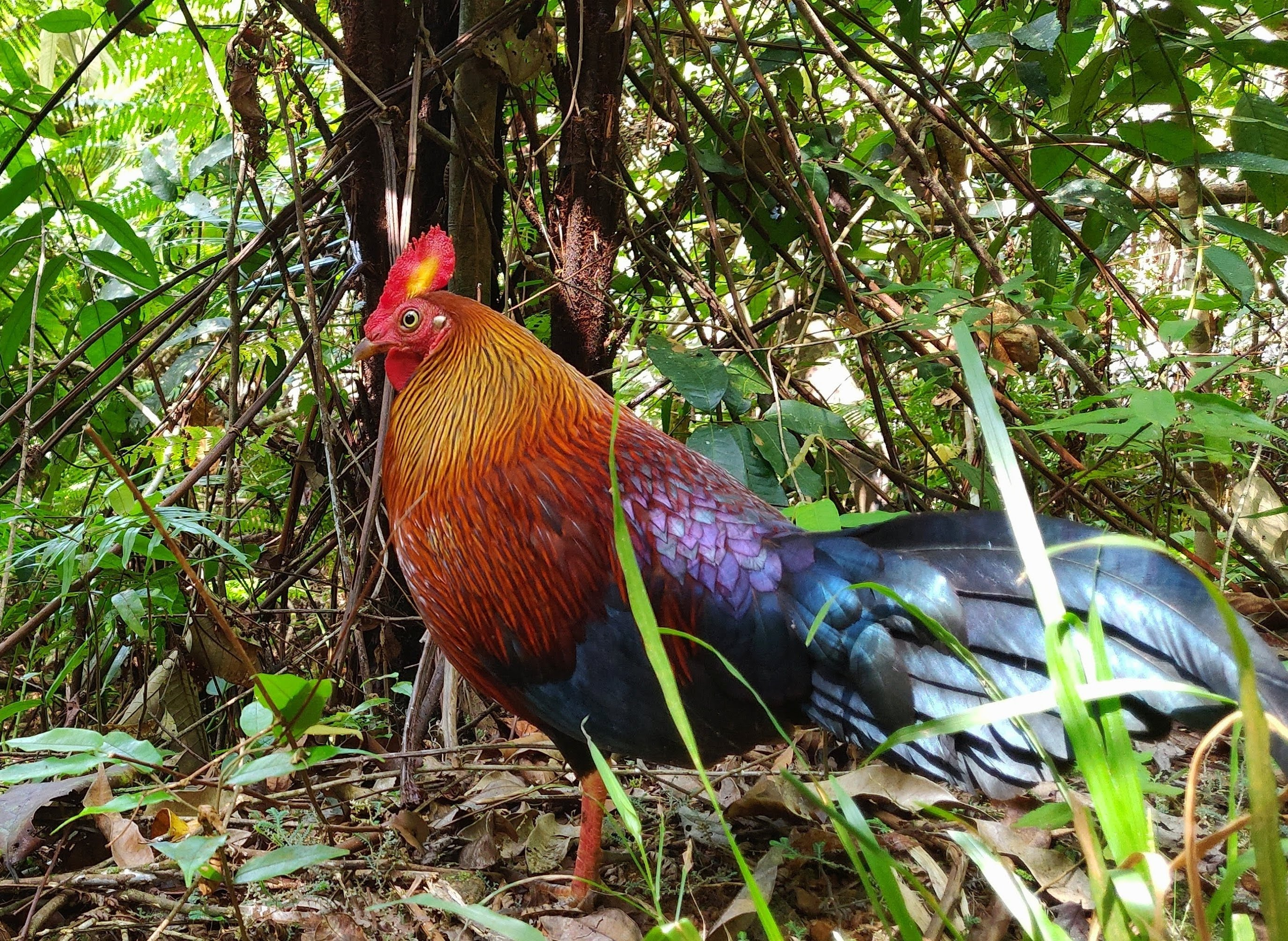
Sri Lankan Junglefowl at Sinharaja Forest Reserve

== Behaviour ==
As with other jungle fowl, Sri Lankan jungle fowl are primarily terrestrial. They spend most of their time foraging for food by scratching the ground for various seeds, fallen fruit, and insects.

Females lay two to four eggs in a nest, either on the forest floor in steep hill country or in the abandoned nests of other birds and squirrels. Like the grey and green junglefowl, male Sri Lankan junglefowl play an active role in nest protection and chick rearing.

== Reproduction ==
The reproductive strategy of this species is best described as facultative polyandry, in that a single female is typically linked with two or three males that form a pride of sorts. These males are likely to be siblings. The female pairs with the alpha male of the pride and nests high off the ground.

Her eggs are highly variable in colour, but generally are cream with a yellow or pink tint. Purple or brownish spots are common. Occasionally, a female produces red eggs or blotched eggs.

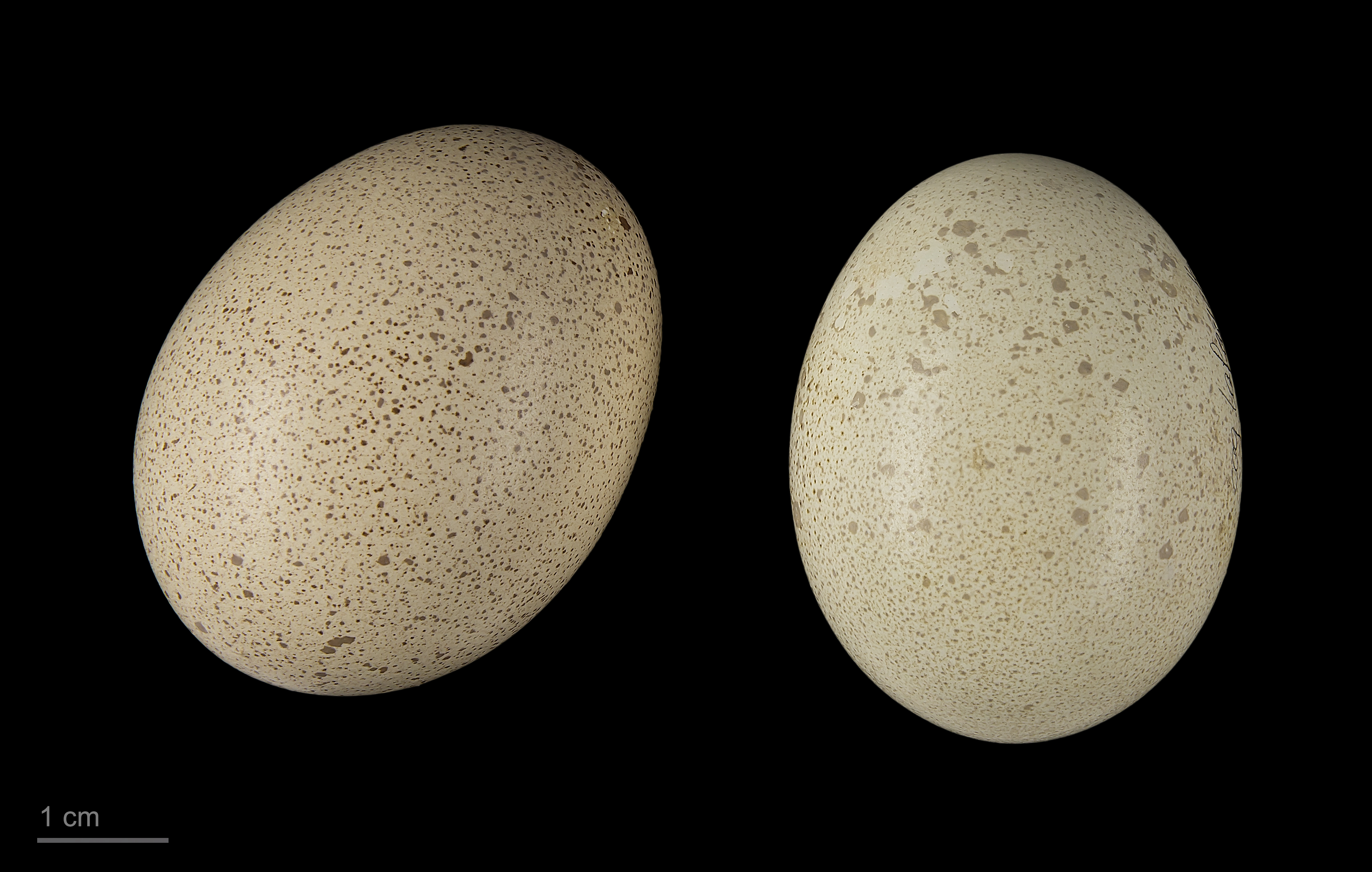
Gallus lafayettii - MHNT

The hen incubates her eggs, while the alpha male guards her nest from a nearby perch during the nesting season. The beta males remain in close proximity, and guard the nesting territory from intruders or potential predators, such as rival males, or snakes and mongooses. Sri Lankan junglefowl are unique amongst the junglefowl in the brevity of their incubation, which may be as short as 20 days as contrasted with the 21–26 days of the green junglefowl.

The chicks require a constant diet of live food, usually insects and isopods such as sowbugs and pillbugs. In particular, the juveniles of land crabs are also highly important to the growth and survivability of the juvenile and subadult Sri Lankan junglefowl. In captivity, this species is particularly vulnerable to a poultry disease caused by the bacteria Salmonella pullorum and other bacterial diseases common in domestic poultry. The chicks, and to a slightly lesser extent the adults, are incapable of using vegetable-based proteins and fats. Their dietary requirements cannot be met with commercial processed food materials. As a result, they are exceedingly rare in captivity.

== Sound ==
While foraging on the ground, the Ceylon junglefowl male utters some short calls "kreeu, kreeu, kreeuu". It also utters high-pitched rooster-like crow "cor-cor-chow" at dawn, often from a tree-branch. The female gives some "kwikkuk, kwikkukkuk". The male is more vocal during the breeding season with advertising calls and various sounds during displays, as well with female as with rivals and in territorial defence.

== In other languages ==
In Sinhala, it is known as වළි කුකුළා (wali kukula) and in Tamil, it is known as இலங்கைக் காட்டுக்கோழி (ilaṅkaik kāṭṭukkōḻi).

== Tailless mutant ==
In 1807, a tailless Sri Lankan junglefowl was described by the Dutch zoologist Coenraad Jacob Temminck (1778–1858). He named them Gallus ecaudatus.

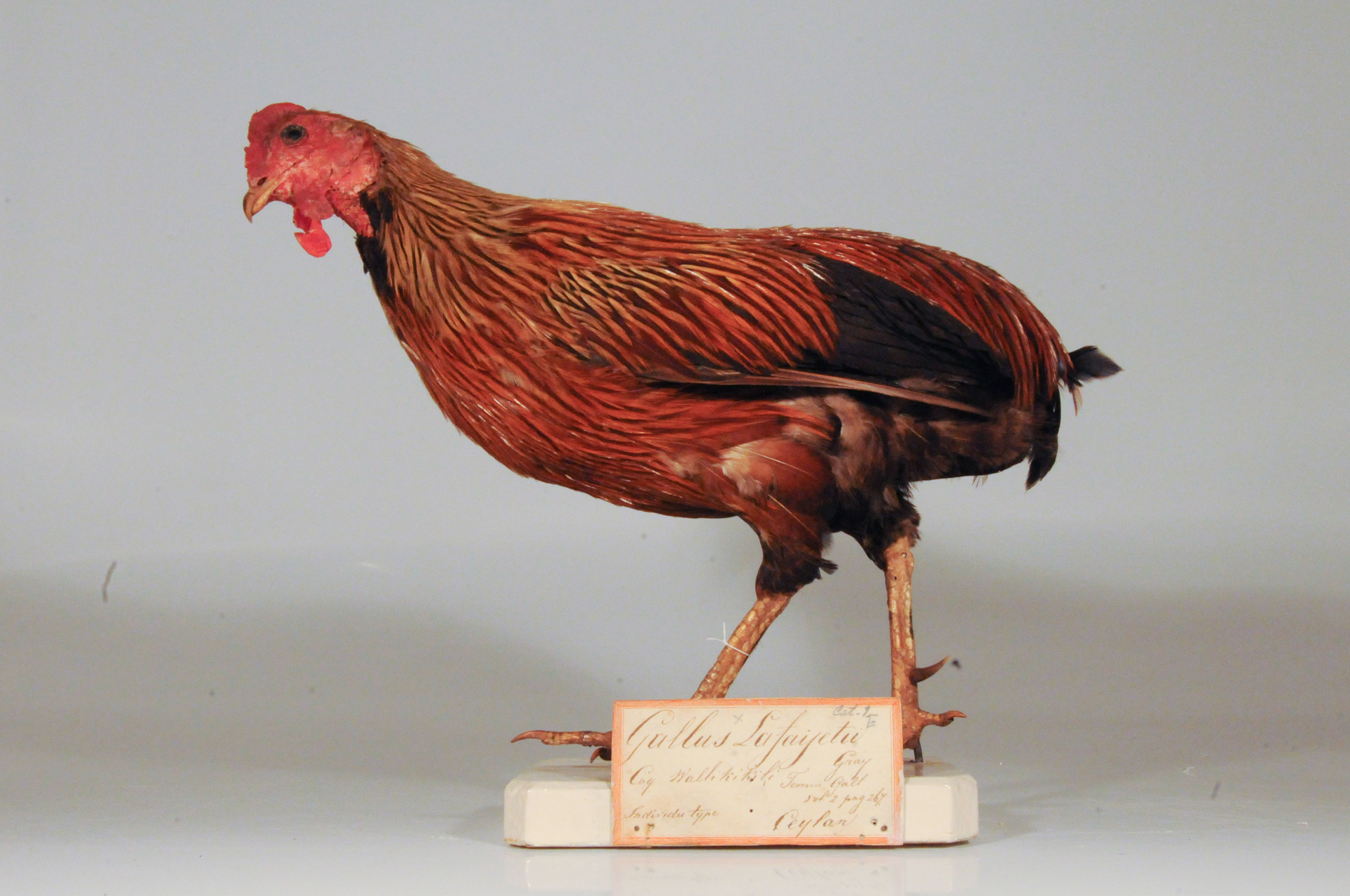
Specimen from Temminck's former private collection: tailless mutant of Sri Lankan junglefowl which served as model for watercolour (Naturalis Biodiversity Center, Leiden, the Netherlands).

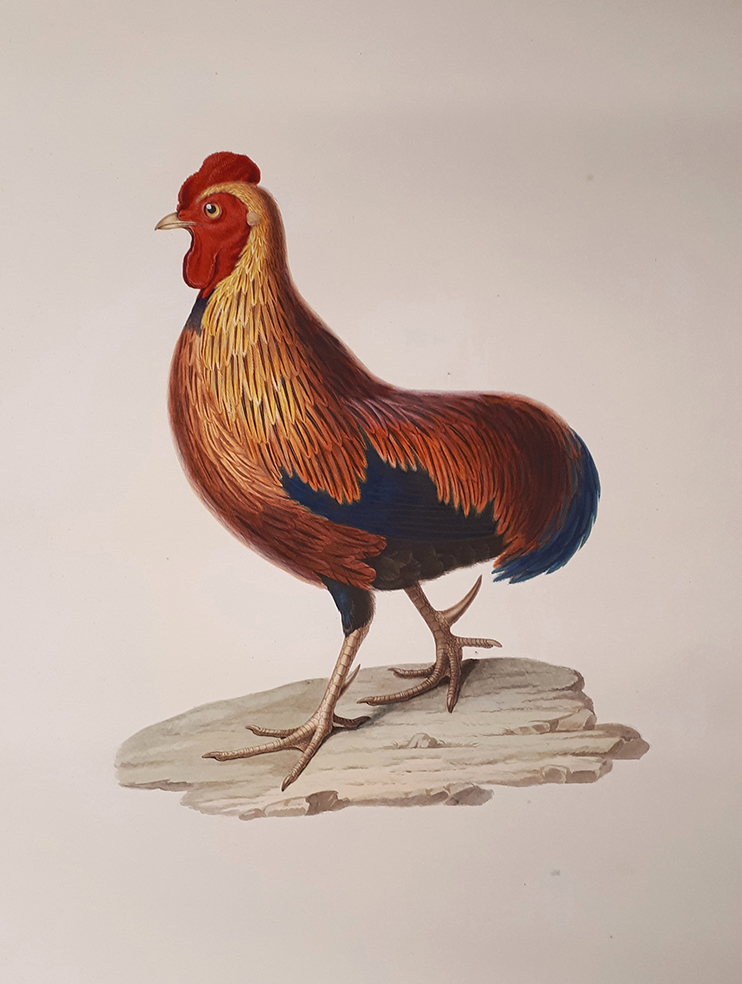
Watercolour of tailless mutant of Sri Lankan junglefowl (1806) by Jean-Gabriel Prêtre (1768–1849), commissioned by Coenraad Jacob Temminck (1778–1858) (Naturalis Biodiversity Center, Leiden, the Netherlands).
