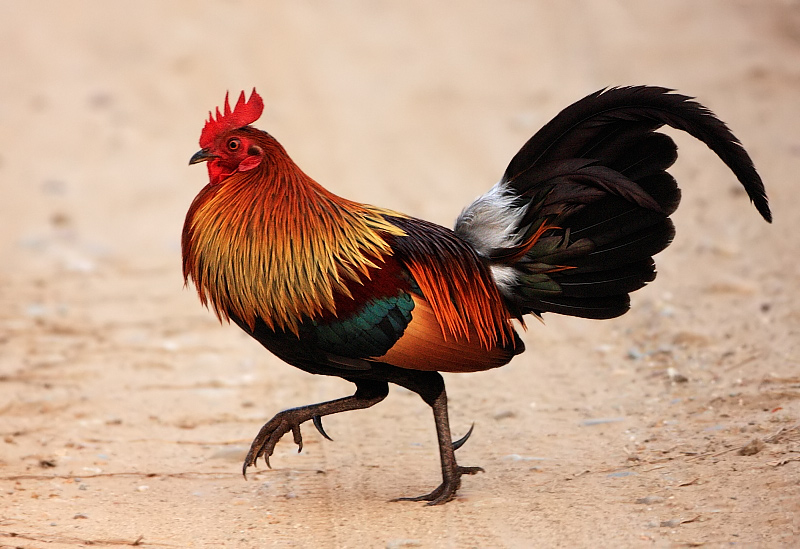
- Male red junglefowl (rooster)

Conservation status
- Least Concern (IUCN 3.1)

Scientific classification
- Kingdom: Animalia
- Phylum: Chordata
- Class: Aves
- Order: Galliformes
- Family: Phasianidae
- Genus: Gallus
- Species: G. gallus

Binomial name
- Gallus gallus (Linnaeus, 1758)
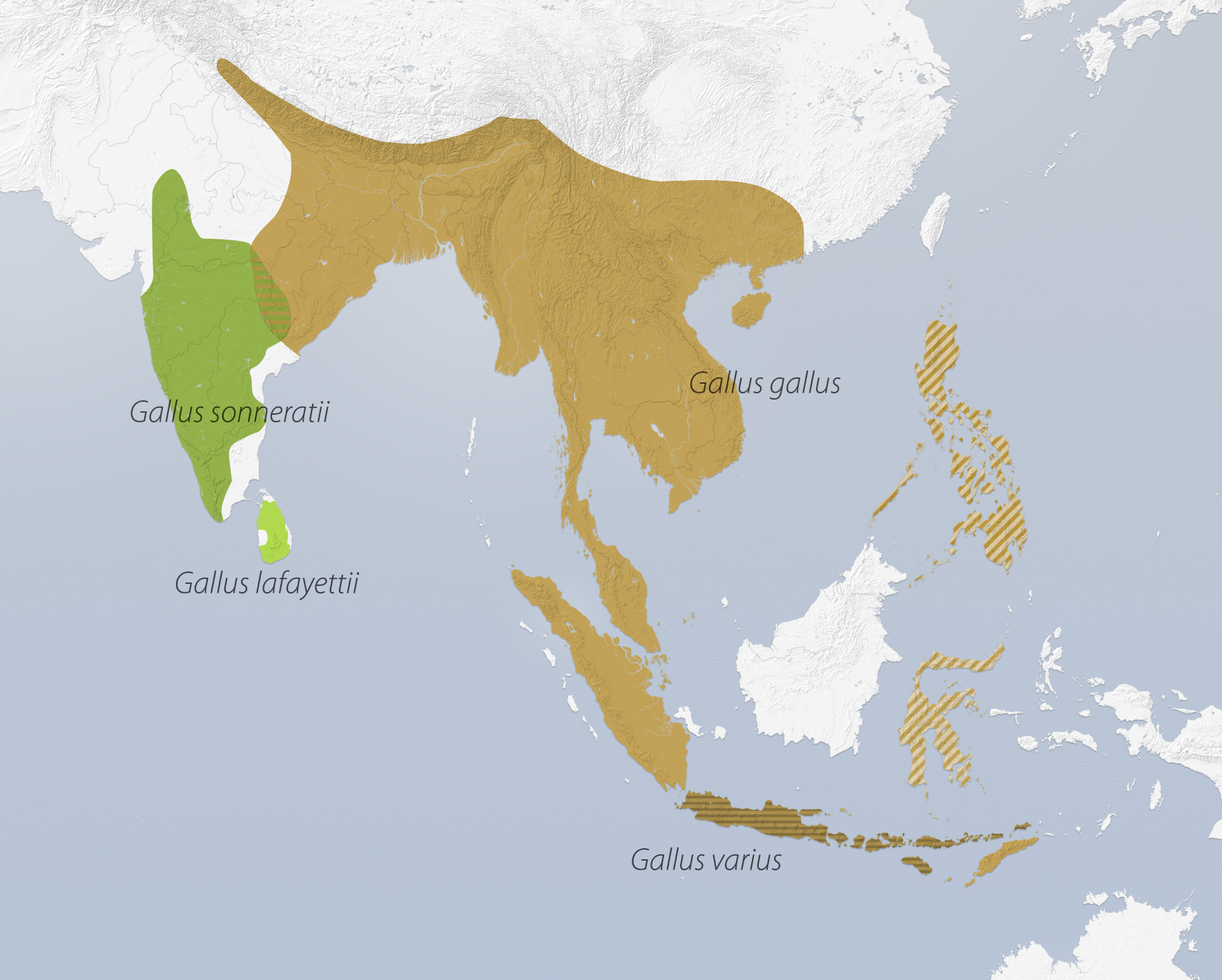
- Distribution of the four species of genus Gallus (red junglefowl in light brown)

Synonyms
- Phasianus gallus Linnaeus, 1758

= Red junglefowl =

Species of bird; ancestor of the chicken

The red junglefowl (Gallus gallus), also known as the Indian red junglefowl (and formerly the bankiva or bankiva-fowl), is a species of tropical, galliform bird in the phasianid family, found across much of Southeast Asia and parts of South Asia.

The red junglefowl was the primary species to give rise to today's many breeds of chicken (G. g. domesticus). Lesser contributions came from the grey junglefowl (G. sonneratii), Sri Lankan junglefowl (G. lafayettii) and the Javanese green junglefowl (G. varius). Whole genome sequencing has revealed that the chicken was first domesticated from red junglefowl ca. 8,000 years ago, with this domestication event involving multiple maternal origins.

The domesticated variant is raised worldwide by humans in their tens of billions for their meat, eggs, colourful plumage and companionship. The wild form of G. gallus is sometimes used in zoos, parks or botanical gardens as a form of pest control, similarly to—and often kept with—the Indian peafowl (Pavo cristatus) or the helmeted guinea fowl (Numida meleagris).

== Taxonomy ==
The red junglefowl was formally described in 1758 by the Swedish naturalist Carl Linnaeus in the tenth edition of his Systema Naturae under the binomial name Phasianus gallus. Linnaeus specified the type locality as "India orientali" but this has been restricted to the island of Pulo Condor (Côn Đảo) off the coast of Vietnam. The red junglefowl is now one of the four species placed in the genus Gallus that was introduced in 1760 by Mathurin Jacques Brisson. The word gallus is Latin for a farmyard cockerel.

- Gallus
  - Green junglefowl–Gallus varius (Shaw, 1798)
  - - Red junglefowl–Gallus gallus (Linnaeus, 1758)
    - - Sri Lankan junglefowl–Gallus lafayettii (Lesson, 1831)
      - Grey junglefowl–Gallus sonneratii (Temminck, 1813)

Cladogram showing the species in the genus Gallus.

=== Subspecies ===
Five subspecies of G. gallus are recognised:

- G. g. murghi (Indian red junglefowl) Robinson & Kloss, 1920 – north India, Nepal, Bhutan and Bangladesh
- G. g. spadiceus (Burmese red junglefowl) (Bonnaterre, 1792) – northeast India to south China, Malay Peninsula and north Sumatra
- G. g. jabouillei (Tonkin red junglefowl) Delacour & Kinnear, 1928 – south China to north Vietnam and north Laos
- G. g. gallus (Cochin-Chinese red junglefowl) (Linnaeus, 1758) – south Myanmar through Indochina (this is the nominate subspecies)
- G. g. bankiva (Javan red junglefowl) Temminck, 1813 – Java and Bali

== Description ==
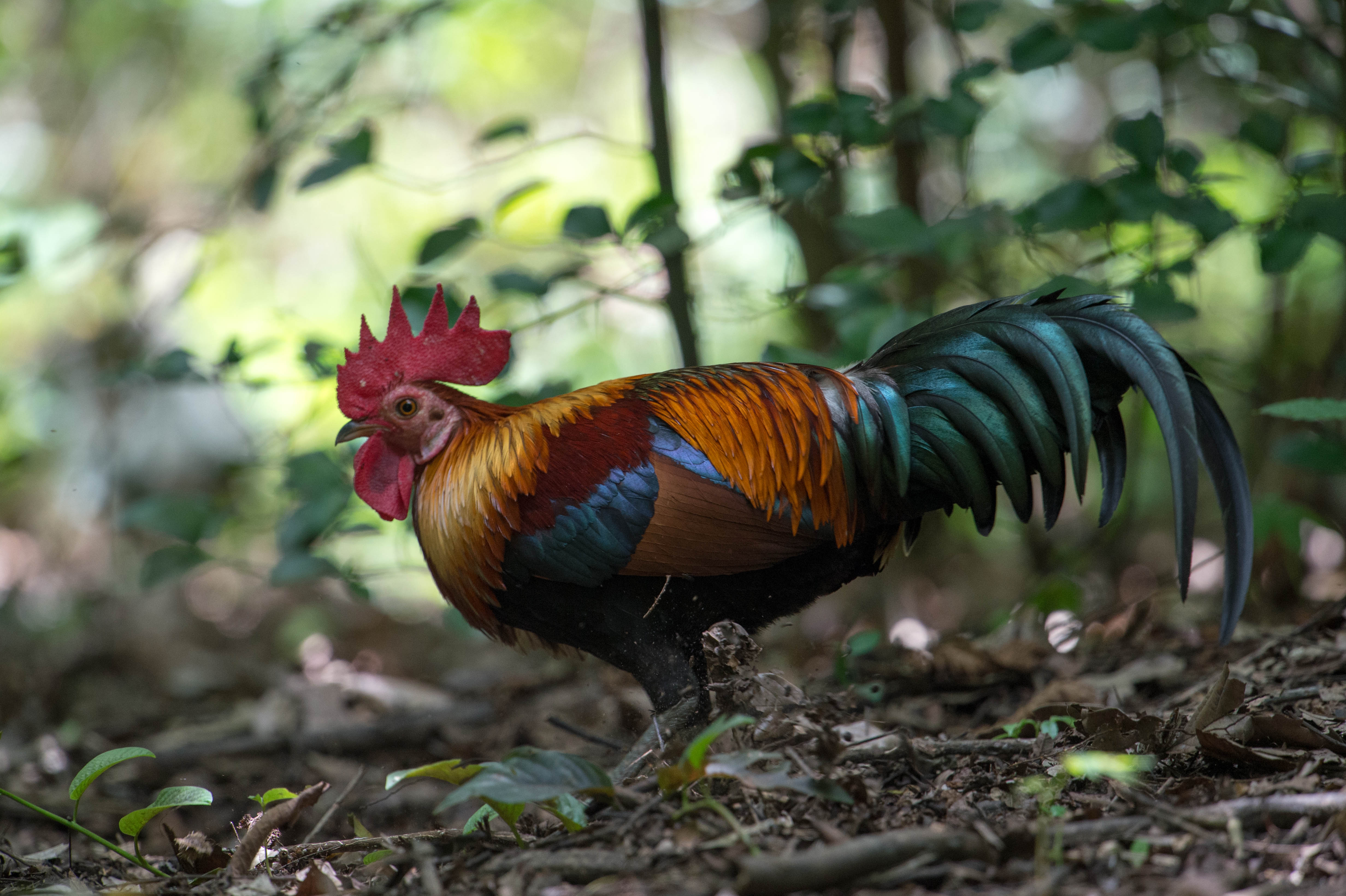
Male red junglefowl in Kaeng Krachan, Phetchaburi, Thailand

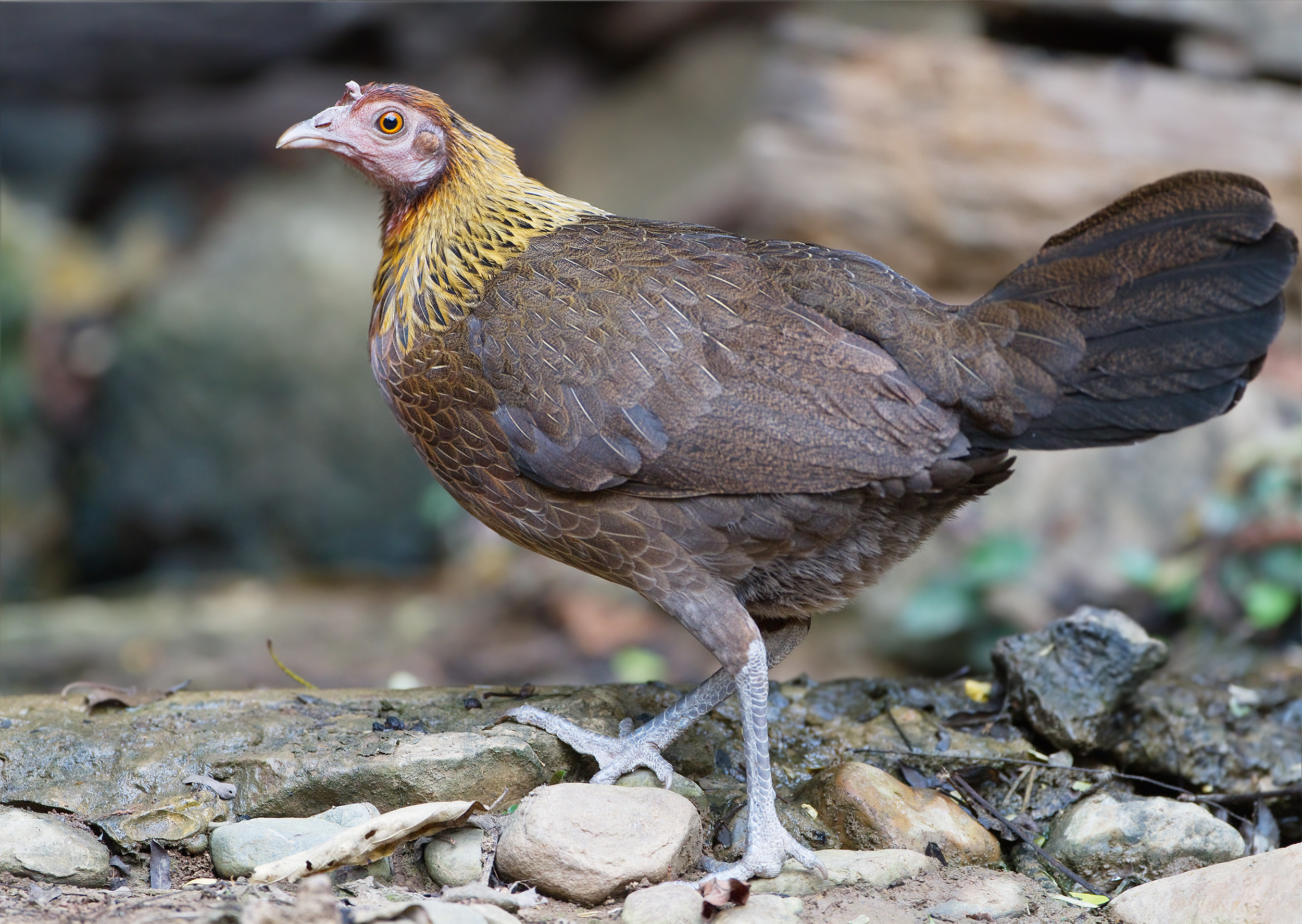
Female red junglefowl in Kaeng Krachan, Phetchaburi, Thailand

The species exhibits significant sexual dimorphism. Males are referred to as "roosters", while females are referred to as "hens". Compared with the domestic chicken, the red junglefowl has a much smaller body mass. The roosters are significantly larger than the hens — males weigh around 1.5 kilograms (3.3 lb), while females weigh around 1 kilogram (2.2 lb).

The plumage of the male is much brighter in colouration than that of the female, which is a drab colour and more suitable for camouflage. The mantle (neck and back) of the rooster typically has long, golden hackle feathers. The tail consists of 14 iridescent feathers that shimmer with blue, purple, and green in direct light. Some of these tail feathers are long and curved, and can grow up to 28 centimetres (11 in) in length. The whole bird may be as long as 70 centimetres (28 in). Hens lack the long, ornate feathers that are a prominent feature of the roosters.

The colouration of the males varies somewhat, depending on the subspecies. For example, some have golden yellow covert feathers from the neck to the lower back with greenish-black tail feathers, while others have red with black tails.

A moult around June changes the plumage of breeding adults to an eclipse pattern, which lasts through October. The male eclipse pattern includes black feathers on the back and small red-orange plumes distributed across the mantle. The eclipse plumage of the hen is generally indistinguishable from the plumage at other seasons, but the moulting schedule is the same as that of the rooster.

The male has a much larger comb and wattle (fleshy ornaments on the head that signal good health to rivals and potential mates) compared with the female. Roosters have a sharp, bony growth on the back of each leg, just behind and above the foot. These spurs are used as a defence mechanism against predators and to establish dominance in the flock.

== Range ==
The native geographic range of the red junglefowl extends from Pakistan, India, Nepal, Bhutan, and Bangladesh in the west, eastwards across southern China, to Myanmar, Thailand, Cambodia, Laos, and Vietnam, and south/southeast into Malaysia, Singapore, the Philippines, Indonesia, and Timor-Leste.

The species has been introduced in Australia, Dominican Republic, Fiji, Hawaii, Jamaica, Marshall Islands, Micronesia, Nauru, Northern Mariana Islands, Palau, Puerto Rico, and Samoa.

== Habitat ==
Red junglefowl prefer disturbed habitats and edges, both natural and human-created. The forage and thick cover in these sorts of areas are attractive to junglefowl, especially nesting females. Junglefowl use both deforested and regenerating forests, and often are found near human settlements or areas of regrowth from slash-and-burn agriculture. Areas burned to promote bamboo growth also attract junglefowl, with edible bamboo seeds more available. In some areas, red junglefowl are absent from silvicultural and rubber plantations; elsewhere, they will occur in both tea plant and palm oil plantations. In the state of Selangor, Malaysia, palm foliage provides suitable cover; palm nut fruit provides adequate food, as well as insects (and their larvae) within, and adjacent to, the trees. The palms also offer an array of roost sites, from the low perches (~4 m) favoured by females with chicks to the higher perches (up to 12 m) used by other adults.

Red junglefowl drink surface water when it is available, but they do not require it. Birds in north-central India visit water holes frequently during the dry season, although not all junglefowl on the subcontinent live close enough to water to do so; population densities may thus be lower, where surface water is limited.

== Behaviour ==
The red junglefowl is shy of humans, compared with the domesticated chicken. The eggs and chicks are cared for only by the hens.

Male birds announce their presence with the well-known "cock-a-doodle-doo" call, referred to as "crowing". This both attracts potential mates and makes other male birds in the area aware of the risk of fighting a breeding competitor. The crowing of roosters is controlled by their circadian clock. When one rooster announces the break of dawn, others in the vicinity immediately follow.

Chickens are highly social animals, and a strict dominance hierarchy exists in flocks. The top-ranking rooster always crows first, followed by its subordinates, in descending order of social rank.

Their call structure is complex and they have distinctive alarm calls for aerial and ground predators to which others react appropriately. Male red junglefowl have a shorter crowing sound than domestic roosters; the call cuts off abruptly at the end.

Red junglefowl regularly bathe in dust to keep the right balance of oil in their plumage. The dust absorbs extra oil and subsequently falls off.

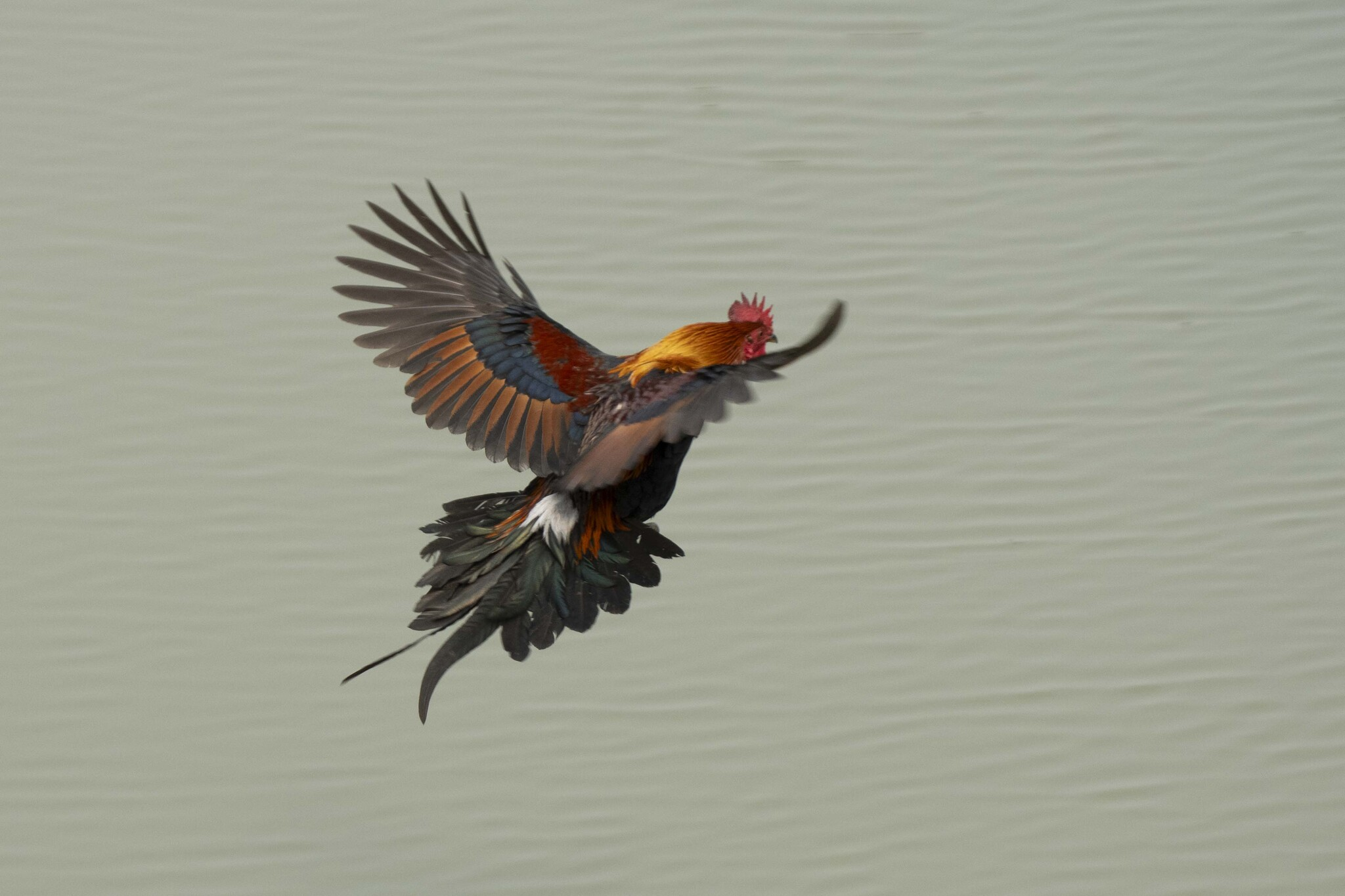
In flight, in Assam, India

Flight in these birds is almost purely confined to reaching their roosting areas at sunset in trees or any other high and relatively safe places free from ground predators, and for escape from immediate danger through the day.

Dominant male junglefowl appear to defend a territory against other dominant males, and the size of the territories has been inferred based on the proximity of roosts. Beebe concluded that territories were rather small, especially as compared to some of the pheasants with which he was familiar. This was supported by Collias and Collias, who reported that adjacent roost sites can be as close as 100 metres (330 ft). Within flocks, male red junglefowl exhibit dominance hierarchies, and dominant males tend to have larger combs than subordinate males. Red junglefowl typically live in flocks of one to a few males and several females. Males are more likely to occur alone than females.

== Diet ==
Red junglefowl are attracted to areas with ripe fruit or seeds, including fruit plantations, fields of domestic grain, and stands of bamboo. Although junglefowl typically eat fallen fruits and seeds on the ground, they occasionally forage in trees by perching on branches and feeding on hanging fruit. Fruits and seeds of scores of plant species have been identified from junglefowl crops, along with grasses, leaves, roots, and tubers. In addition, red junglefowl capture a wide variety of arthropods, other invertebrates, and vertebrates such as small lizards. Even mammalian faeces may be consumed. Many of these items are taken opportunistically as the birds forage, although some arthropods, such as termites, are taken in large quantities; about 1,000 individual termites have been found in a single specimen's crop. Plant materials constitute a higher proportion of the diet of adult red junglefowl than do arthropods and other animals. In contrast, chicks eat mostly adult and larval insects, earthworms, and only occasional plant material.

== Reproduction ==
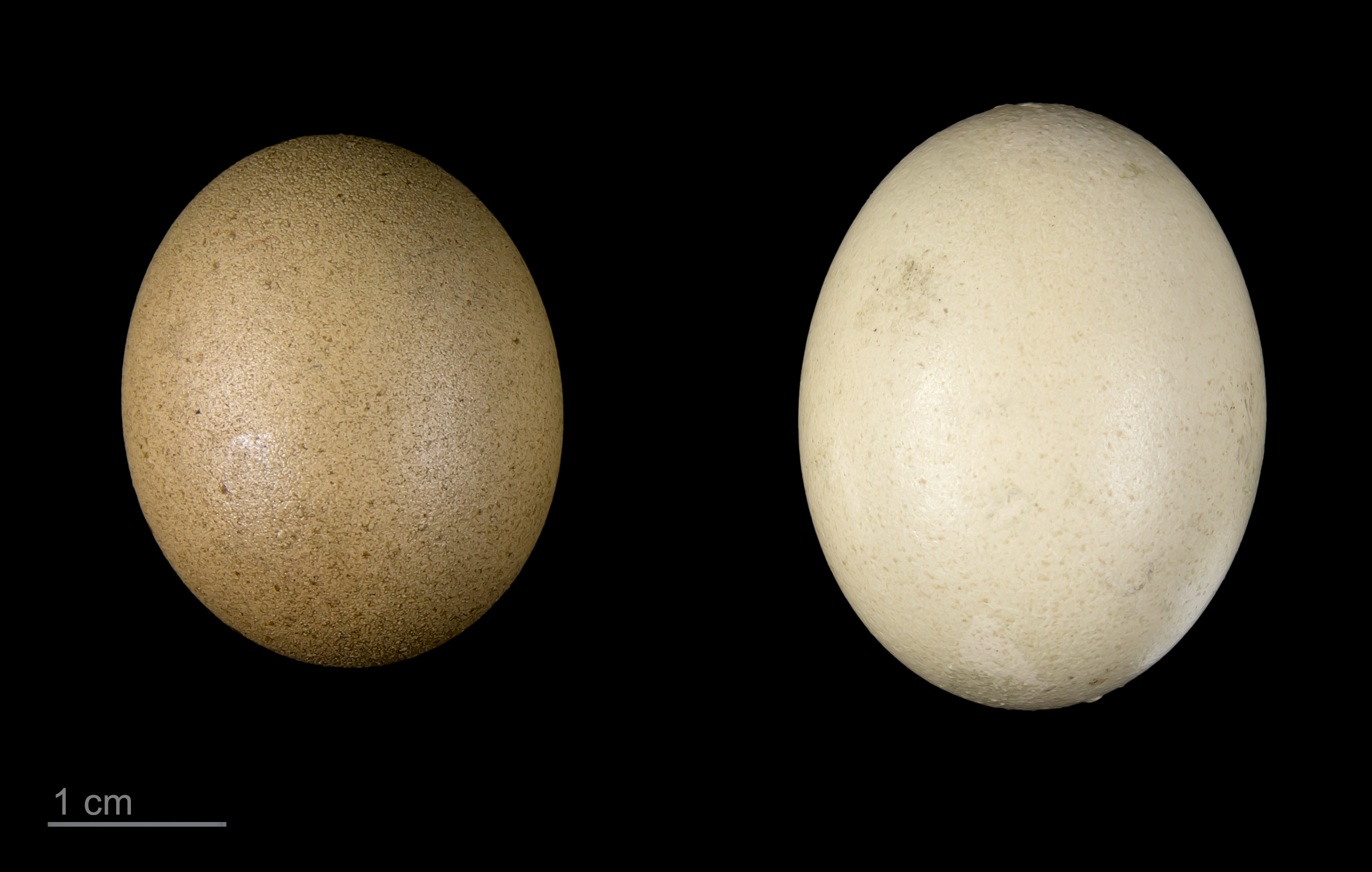
Egg of G. gallus (left) and that of G. gallus domesticus (right) at the Muséum de Toulouse

Males make a food-related display called "tidbitting", performed upon finding food in the presence of a female. The display is composed of coaxing, cluck-like calls, and eye-catching bobbing and twitching motions of the head and neck. During the performance, the male repeatedly picks up and drops the food item with his beak. The display usually ends when the hen takes the food item either from the ground or directly from the male's beak. Eventually, they sometimes mate.

In many areas, red junglefowl breed during the dry portion of the year, typically winter or spring. This is true in parts of India, Nepal, Thailand, Vietnam, and Laos. However, year-round breeding by red junglefowl has been documented in palm oil plantations in Malaysia and also may occur elsewhere. During the laying period, red junglefowl females lay an egg every day. Eggs take 21 days to develop. Chicks fledge in about 4 to 5 weeks, and at 12 weeks old they are chased out of the group by their mother — at which point they start a new group or join an existing one. Sexual maturity is reached at 5 months, with females taking slightly longer than males to reach maturity.

Dominant males attempt to maintain exclusive reproductive access to females, though females choose to mate with subordinate males about 40% of the time in a free-ranging feral flock in San Diego, California.

== Relationship with humans ==
Chickens were created when red junglefowl were domesticated for human use around 8,000 years ago as subspecies Gallus gallus domesticus. They are now a major source of food for humans. However, undomesticated red junglefowl still represent an important source of meat and eggs in their endemic range. The undomesticated form is sometimes used in cockfighting.

=== Timeline of domestication ===
Junglefowl were one of three main animals (along with domesticated pigs and dogs) carried by early Austronesian peoples from Maritime Southeast Asia in their voyages to the islands of Oceania in prehistory, starting around 5,000 years BP. Today, their modern descendants are found throughout Micronesia, Melanesia, and Polynesia.

In 2012, a study examined mitochondrial DNA recovered from ancient bones from Europe, Thailand, the Pacific, and Chile, and from Spanish colonial sites in Florida and the Dominican Republic. The authors concluded that the chicken was primarily domesticated from red junglefowl, with subsequent genetic contributions from grey junglefowl, Sri Lankan junglefowl, and green junglefowl. Domestication occurred about 8,000 years ago, as based on molecular evidence from a common ancestor flock in the bird's natural range, and then proceeded in waves both east and west.

In a 2020 study that fully sequenced 863 chickens worldwide, the authors concluded that all domestic chickens originated from a single domestication event of G.gallus (specifically, the G. g. spadiceus subspecies) in Southeast Asia, around 9500 years ago. These early domesticated chickens spread across Southeast and South Asia, where they interbred with the local subspecies of junglefowl, forming genetically and geographically distinct groups.

Other archaeological evidence suggests domestication dates around 7,400 BP from the Chishan site, in the Hebei province of China. However, the domestication event in China has now been disputed by several studies citing unfavourable weather conditions at the time. In the Ganges region of India, wild red junglefowl were being used by humans as early as 7,000 years ago. No domestic chicken remains older than 4,000 years have been identified in the Indus Valley, and the antiquity of chickens recovered from excavations at Mohenjo-daro is still debated.

== Genetics ==
Genomic information
- NCBI ID: 9031
- Ploidy: diploid
- Number of chromosomes: 78
- Year of completion: 2012

=== Orthology ===
G. gallus has three transferrins, all of which cluster closely with other vertebrates' orthologs.

=== Hybridisation ===
The other three members of the genus — Sri Lanka junglefowl (G. lafayetii), grey junglefowl (G. sonneratii), and green junglefowl (G. varius) — do not usually produce fertile hybrids with the red junglefowl. However, supporting the hypothesis of a hybrid origin, research published in 2008 found that the gene responsible for the yellow skin of the domestic chicken most likely originated in the closely related grey junglefowl and not from the red junglefowl. Similarly, a 2020 study that analysed the whole genomes of Sri Lanka junglefowl, grey junglefowl, and green junglefowl found strong introgressive hybridisation events in different populations of indigenous village chickens. The study also shows that 71–79% of red junglefowl DNA is shared with the domestic chicken. A culturally significant hybrid between the red junglefowl and the green junglefowl in Indonesia is known as the bekisar.

== Conservation status ==
Wild-type red junglefowl are thought to be facing threats due to hybridisation at forest edges, where domesticated free-ranging chickens are common. Hybridisation can lead to genetic dilution, potentially affecting the species' distinct characteristics and adaptations to the wild. In addition, habitat loss due to deforestation and urbanisation has contributed to population declines in certain regions. Hunting for food and the pet trade also pose threats to local populations, particularly in areas where the species is not legally protected.

The red junglefowl is considered near threatened in Singapore. Nevertheless, they are classified by the IUCN as a species of least concern.
