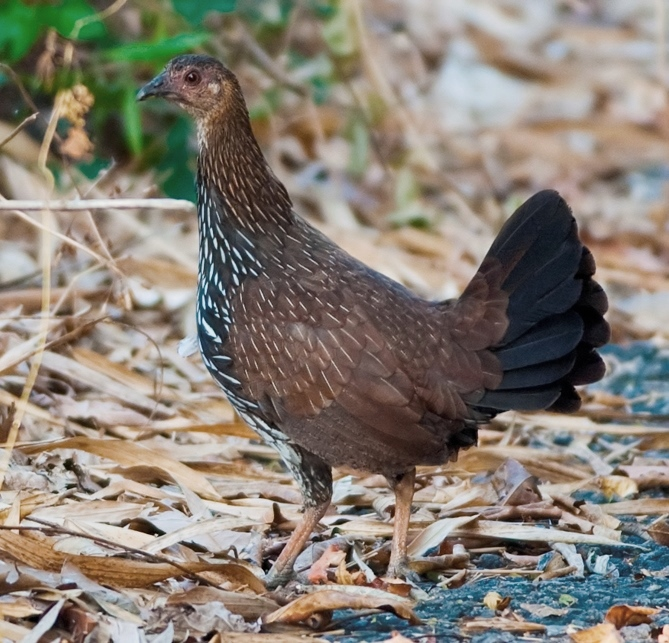
- Grey junglefowl (G. sonneratii) hen

Scientific classification
- Kingdom: Animalia
- Phylum: Chordata
- Class: Aves
- Order: Galliformes
- Family: Phasianidae
- Tribe: Gallini
- Genus: Gallus; Brisson, 1760

Type species
- Phasianus gallus Linnaeus, 1758

Species
- four species
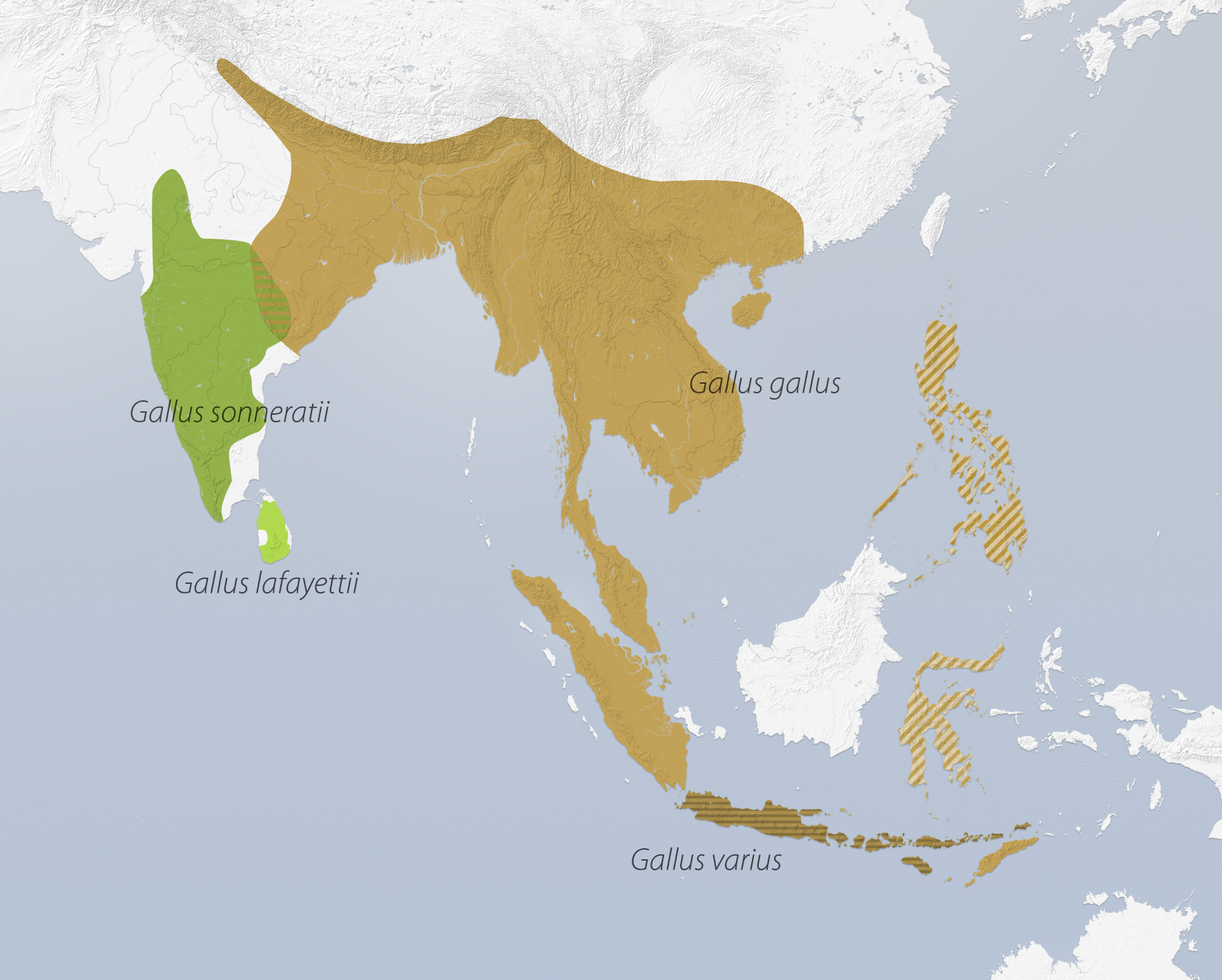
- Gallus gallus Gallus lafayettii Gallus sonneratii Gallus varius

= Junglefowl =

Junglefowl Temporal range: Late Miocene – recent

Genus of birds

Junglefowl are four extant species of mostly ground-dwelling birds from the genus Gallus in the order Galliformes (landfowl), native to the woodlands in parts of South and Southeast Asia. One species in particular, the red junglefowl, is of historical importance as the direct ancestor of the chicken, the most numerous of domesticated animals and the most populous bird subspecies, although the three sister species (grey junglefowl, green junglefowl and Sri Lankan junglefowl) are likely to have also been involved in hybridization variably.

The four species of junglefowl diverged from common ancestry about 4–6 million years ago. Although originating in Asia, junglefowl bones have also been found in Chile, which date back to 1321–1407 CE, providing evidence of possible Polynesian migration across the Pacific Ocean.

Junglefowl are omnivorous, feeding on a variety diet of foliages, grits and seeds, leaf litters and invertebrates (predominantly insects and worms), and occasionally also small frogs, lizards and even mice. They are medium-sized birds with limited flight abilities and distinct sexual dimorphism, with colourful plumage in males (known as cocks or roosters) and drab-colored feathers in females (known as hens). As with many other birds in the pheasant family, junglefowl do not form pair bonds after mating, and the males take no part in egg incubation or the rearing of the precocial young (known as chicks), while these duties are performed by the more well-camouflaged females.

== Taxonomy ==
The genus Gallus was erected by the French scientist Mathurin Jacques Brisson in his Ornithologie published in 1760. The type species is the red junglefowl (Gallus gallus). The Swedish naturalist Carl Linnaeus had introduced the genus Gallus in the 6th edition of his Systema Naturae published in 1748, but Linnaeus dropped the genus in the important tenth edition of 1758 and put the red junglefowl together with the common pheasant in the genus Phasianus. However, the red junglefowl and common pheasant are now known to have diverged about 18–23 million years ago, and belong to different subfamilies. This pairwise divergence time was also the same between the other three junglefowls and the pheasant. As the publication date of Linnaeus's sixth edition was before the 1758 starting point of the International Commission on Zoological Nomenclature, Brisson and not Linnaeus is considered as the authority for the genus.

- Gallus
  - Green junglefowl–Gallus varius (Shaw, 1798)
  - - Red junglefowl–Gallus gallus (Linnaeus, 1758)
    - - Sri Lankan junglefowl–Gallus lafayettii (Lesson, 1831)
      - Grey junglefowl–Gallus sonneratii (Temminck, 1813)

Cladogram showing the species in the genus Gallus.

More recent phylogenetic evidence supports the closest relatives of Gallus being the bamboo partridges in the genus Bambusicola, from which they diverged about 15 million years ago.

=== Extant species ===
The genus contains four species.

Genus Gallus – Brisson, 1760 – four species
Common name	Scientific name and subspecies	Range	Size and ecology	IUCN status and estimated population
Red junglefowl Male Female	Gallus gallus (Linnaeus, 1758) Five subspecies: G. g. bankiva (Temminck, 1813); G. g. gallus (Linnaeus, 1758); G. g. jabouillei (Delacour & Kinnear, 1928); G. g. murghi (Robinson & Kloss, 1920); G. g. spadiceus (Bonnaterre, 1792)	India, Pakistan, eastwards across Indochina and southern China and into Malaysia, Singapore, Philippines and Indonesia	Size: Habitat: Diet:	LC
Sri Lankan junglefowl Male Female	Gallus lafayettii Lesson, 1831	Sri Lanka	Size: Habitat: Diet:	LC
Grey junglefowl Male Female	Gallus sonneratii Temminck, 1813	Indian Peninsula, but extends into Gujarat, Madhya Pradesh, south Rajasthan, and Pakistani Punjab	Size: Habitat: Diet:	LC
Green junglefowl Male Female	Gallus varius (Shaw, 1798)	Java, Bali, Lombok, Komodo, Flores, Rinca, and small islands linking Java with Flores, Indonesia	Size: Habitat: Diet:	LC

== Fossil record ==
Prehistorically, the genus Gallus was found all over Eurasia; in fact, it appears to have evolved in southeastern Europe. A number of fossil species have been described, but their distinctness is not firmly established in most cases:

- Gallus aesculapii Jánossy, 1976 (Late Miocene/Early Pliocene of Greece) - possibly belongs in Pavo
- Gallus moldovicus Burchak, Ganea & Shushpanov, 1993 (Late Pliocene of Moldavia) - sometimes misspelt moldavicus, may be synonym of Pavo bravardi
- Gallus beremendensis Jánossy, 1976 (Late Pliocene/Early Pleistocene of Eastern Europe)
- Giant junglefowl Gallus karabachensis Burchak and Aliev, 1989 (Early Pleistocene of Nagorno-Karabakh)
- Gallus tamanensis Burchak-Abramovich & Potapova, 1996 (Early Pleistocene? of Taman Peninsula)
- Gallus kudarensis Burchak-Abramovich & Potapova, 1996 (Early/Middle Pleistocene of Kudaro, South Ossetia)
- Gallus europaeus Harrison, 1978 (Middle Pleistocene of Italy)
- Gallus imereticus Burchak-Abramovich & Potapova, 1996 (Late Pleistocene of Gvardjilas-Klde, Imeretia)
- Gallus meschtscheriensis Burchak-Abramovich & Potapova, 1996 (Late Pleistocene of Soungir, Russia)
- Gallus georgicus Burchak-Abramovich & Potapova, 1996 (Late Pleistocene - Early Holocene of Georgia)
- Gallus sp. (Middle/Late Pleistocene of Trinka Cave, Moldavia)
- Gallus sp. (Late Pleistocene of Krivtcha Cave, Ukraine)
- Gallus sp. (Early Holocene of Dnieper region)
