= UFSP2 =

Protein-coding gene in the species Homo sapiens

Available structures
PDB	Ortholog search: PDBe RCSB
PDB	List of PDB id codes 3OQC

Identifiers
- Aliases: UFSP2, C4orf20, BHD, UFM1-specific peptidase 2, UFM1 specific peptidase 2, SEMDDR
- External IDs: OMIM: 611482; MGI: 1913679; HomoloGene: 10151; GeneCards: UFSP2; OMA:UFSP2 - orthologs

Gene location (Human)
Chr.	Chromosome 4 (human)
Band	4q35.1	Start	185,399,537 bp
Band	4q35.1	End	185,425,979 bp

Gene location (Mouse)
Chr.	Chromosome 8 (mouse)
Band	8|8 B1.1	Start	46,428,565 bp
Band	8|8 B1.1	End	46,449,995 bp
RNA expression pattern
Bgee	Human / Mouse (ortholog); Top expressed in: Achilles tendon; muscle of thigh; triceps brachii muscle; left ovary; ventricular zone; gastrocnemius muscle; right ovary; Skeletal muscle tissue of rectus abdominis; Skeletal muscle tissue of biceps brachii; Descending thoracic aorta / Top expressed in: seminal vesicula; molar; facial motor nucleus; medial vestibular nucleus; deep cerebellar nuclei; pineal gland; calvaria; right kidney; pontine nuclei; islet of Langerhans; More reference expression data
BioGPS	n/a
Gene ontology
Molecular function	peptidase activity; hydrolase activity; cysteine-type peptidase activity; protein binding; thiolester hydrolase activity; UFM1 hydrolase activity
Cellular component	nucleus; cytoplasm; endoplasmic reticulum
Biological process	regulation of intracellular estrogen receptor signaling pathway; proteolysis
Sources:Amigo / QuickGO
Orthologs
Species	Human	Mouse
Entrez	55325	192169
Ensembl	ENSG00000109775	ENSMUSG00000031634
UniProt	Q9NUQ7	Q99K23
RefSeq (mRNA)	NM_018359	NM_138668
RefSeq (protein)	NP_060829	NP_619609
Location (UCSC)	Chr 4: 185.4 – 185.43 Mb	Chr 8: 46.43 – 46.45 Mb
PubMed search
- Wikidata
View/Edit Human	View/Edit Mouse

UFM1 specific peptidase 2 is a protein that in humans is encoded by the UFSP2 gene.

== Function ==
This gene encodes a highly conserved cysteine protease. The protein cleaves two C-terminal residues from ubiquitin-fold modifier 1, a ubiquitin-like post-translational modifier protein. Activation of ubiquitin-fold modifier 1 by the encoded protein exposes a C-terminal glycine residue that allows interaction with other proteins and transfer to its target protein. An allelic variant of this gene has been associated with Beukes hip dysplasia. Alternative splicing results in multiple transcript variants. [provided by RefSeq, Sep 2016].
