= Ubiquitin-fold modifier conjugating enzyme 1 =

Protein found in humans

UFC1

Identifiers
- Aliases: UFC1, HSPC155, ubiquitin-fold modifier conjugating enzyme 1, NEDSG
- External IDs: OMIM: 610554; MGI: 1913405; GeneCards: UFC1
Available structures
PDB	Ortholog search: PDBe RCSB
PDB	List of PDB id codes 2K07, 2Z6O, 2Z6P, 3EVX

Gene location (Human)
Chr.	Chromosome 1 (human)
Band	1q23.3	Start	161,152,776 bp
Band	1q23.3	End	161,158,856 bp

Gene location (Mouse)
Chr.	Chromosome 1 (mouse)
Band	1 H3|1 79.31 cM	Start	171,288,563 bp
Band	1 H3|1 79.31 cM	End	171,295,024 bp
RNA expression pattern
Bgee	Human / Mouse (ortholog); Top expressed in: bronchial epithelial cell; right uterine tube; olfactory zone of nasal mucosa; epithelium of nasopharynx; body of pancreas; caudate nucleus; islet of Langerhans; nucleus accumbens; body of stomach; left ovary / Top expressed in: parotid gland; facial motor nucleus; islet of Langerhans; lacrimal gland; seminal vesicula; calvaria; Paneth cell; medial ganglionic eminence; lens; Epithelium of choroid plexus; More reference expression data
BioGPS	n/a
Gene ontology
Molecular function	protein binding; UFM1 transferase activity
Cellular component	extracellular exosome; cytoplasm
Biological process	protein K69-linked ufmylation; response to endoplasmic reticulum stress; protein ufmylation; brain development
Sources:Amigo / QuickGO
Orthologs
Databases	NCBI: entry; OMA: entry
Species	Human	Mouse
Entrez	51506	66155
Ensembl	ENSG00000143222	ENSMUSG00000062963
UniProt	Q9Y3C8	Q9CR09
RefSeq (mRNA)	NM_016406	NM_025388
RefSeq (protein)	NP_057490	NP_079664; NP_001347860; NP_001347861; NP_001347862
Location (UCSC)	Chr 1: 161.15 – 161.16 Mb	Chr 1: 171.29 – 171.3 Mb
PubMed search
- Wikidata
View/Edit Human	View/Edit Mouse

Ubiquitin-fold modifier conjugating enzyme 1 is a protein that in humans is encoded by the UFC1 gene.

== Function ==
UFC1 is an E2-like conjugating enzyme for ubiquitin-fold modifier-1 (UFM1; MIM 610553) (Komatsu et al., 2004 [PubMed 15071506]).[supplied by OMIM, Mar 2008].
