= Deubiquitinating enzyme =

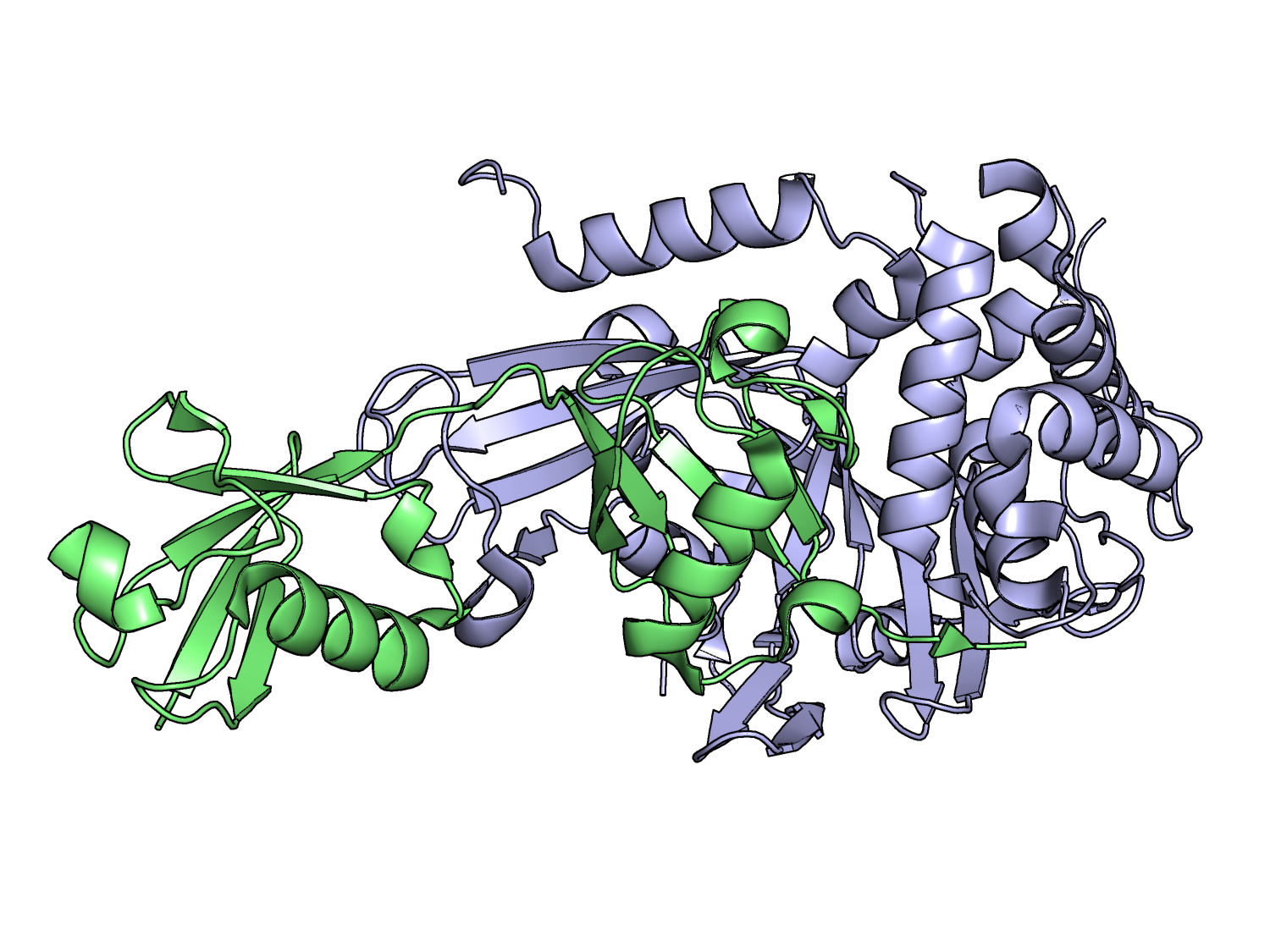
USP21 (blue) covalently linked to linear diubiquitin aldehyde (green). The C-terminus of the ubiquitin protrudes through the active site of USP21 (lower right).

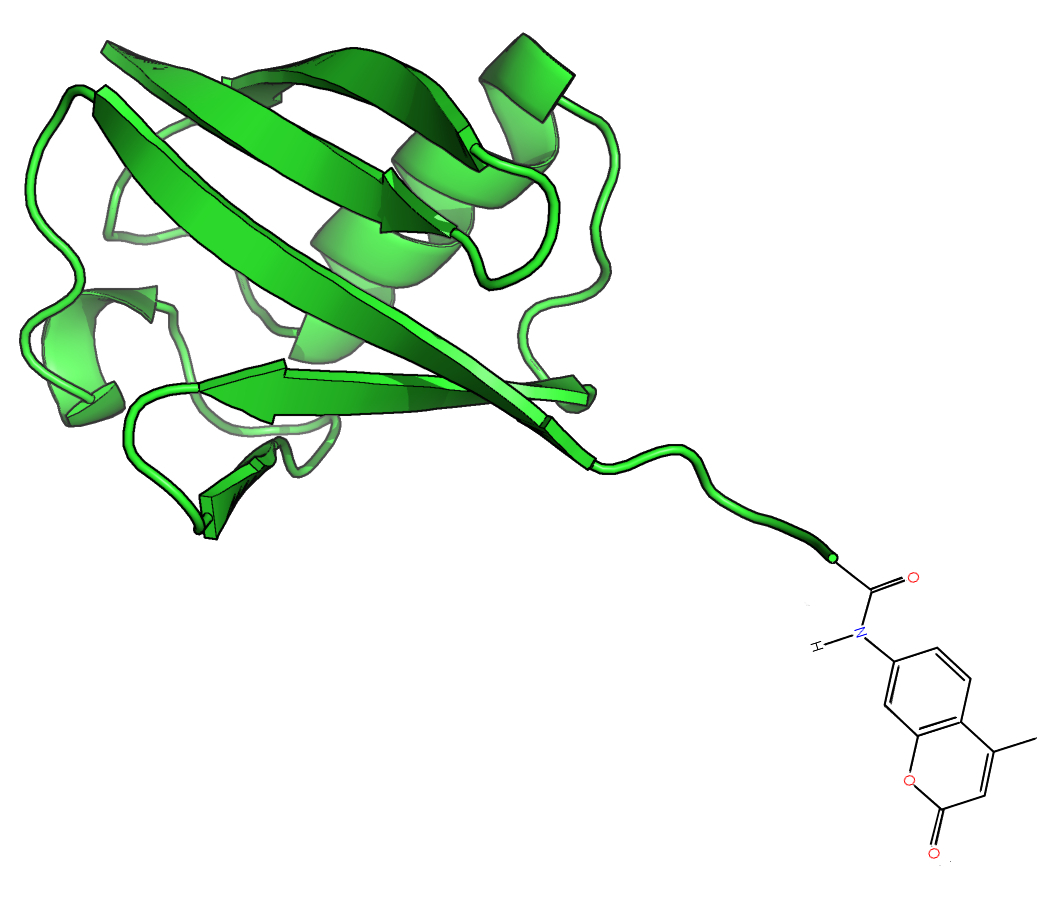
Ubiquitin-AMC, a fluorogenic substrate for a wide range of DUBs

Deubiquitinating enzymes (DUBs), also known as deubiquitinating peptidases, deubiquitinating isopeptidases, deubiquitinases, ubiquitin proteases, ubiquitin hydrolases, or ubiquitin isopeptidases, are a large group of proteases that cleave ubiquitin from proteins. Ubiquitin is attached to proteins in order to regulate the degradation of proteins via the proteasome and lysosome; coordinate the cellular localisation of proteins; activate and inactivate proteins; and modulate protein-protein interactions. DUBs can reverse these effects by cleaving the peptide or isopeptide bond between ubiquitin and its substrate protein. In humans there are nearly 100 DUB genes, which can be classified into two main classes: cysteine proteases and metalloproteases. The cysteine proteases comprise ubiquitin-specific proteases (USPs), ubiquitin C-terminal hydrolases (UCHs), Machado-Josephin domain proteases (MJDs) and ovarian tumour proteases (OTU). The metalloprotease group contains only the Jab1/Mov34/Mpr1 Pad1 N-terminal+ (MPN+) (JAMM) domain proteases.

== Classes ==
In humans there are 102 putative DUB genes, which can be classified into two main classes: cysteine proteases and metalloproteases, consisting of 58 ubiquitin-specific proteases (USPs), 4 ubiquitin C-terminal hydrolases (UCHs), 5 Machado-Josephin domain proteases (MJDs), 14 ovarian tumour proteases (OTU), and 14 Jab1/Mov34/Mpr1 Pad1 N-terminal+ (MPN+) (JAMM) domain-containing genes. 11 of these proteins are predicted to be non-functional, leaving 79 functional enzymes. In yeast, the USPs are known as ubiquitin-specific-processing proteases (UBPs).

=== Cysteine proteases ===
There are six main superfamilies of cysteine protease DUBs:

- the ubiquitin-specific protease (USP/UBP) superfamily; (USP1, USP2, USP3, USP4, USP5, USP6, USP7, USP8, USP9X, USP9Y, USP10, USP11, USP12, USP13, USP14, USP15, USP16, USP17, USP17L2, USP17L3, USP17L4, USP17L5, USP17L7, USP17L8, USP18, USP19, USP20, USP21, USP22, USP23, USP24, USP25, USP26, USP27X, USP28, USP29, USP30, USP31, USP32, USP33, USP34, USP35, USP36, USP37, USP38, USP39, USP40, USP41, USP42, USP43, USP44, USP45, USP46)
- the ovarian tumour (OTU) superfamily (OTUB1, OTUB2);
- and the Machado-Josephin domain (MJD) superfamily. (ATXN3, ATXN3L, JOSD1, JOSD2)
- the ubiquitin C-terminal hydrolase (UCH) superfamily; (BAP1, UCHL1, UCHL3, UCHL5)
- the MINDY family of K48-specific deubiquitinases; (MINDY1, MINDY2, MINDY3, MINDY4)
- the recently discovered ZUFSP family, at present solely represented by ZUP1

UCH
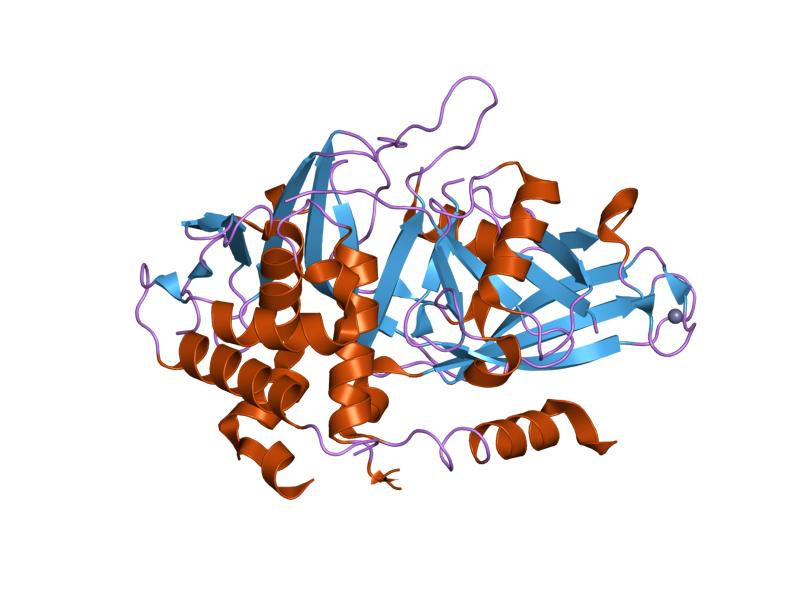
- USP2 in complex with ubiquitin.

Identifiers
- Symbol: UCH
- Pfam: PF00443
- Pfam clan: CL0125
- InterPro: IPR001394
- PROSITE: PDOC00750
- MEROPS: C19
- SCOP2: 1nb8 / SCOPe / SUPFAM
Available protein structures:
- PDB: IPR001394 PF00443 (ECOD; PDBsum)
- AlphaFold: IPR001394; PF00443

There is also a little known putative group of DUBs called the permutated papain fold peptidases of dsDNA viruses and eukaryote (PPPDEs) superfamily, which, if shown to be bona fide DUBs, would be the seventh in the cysteine protease class.

=== Metalloproteases ===
The Jab1/Mov34/Mpr1 Pad1 N-terminal+ (MPN+) (JAMM) domain superfamily proteins bind zinc and hence are metalloproteases.

== Role of deubiquitinating enzymes ==
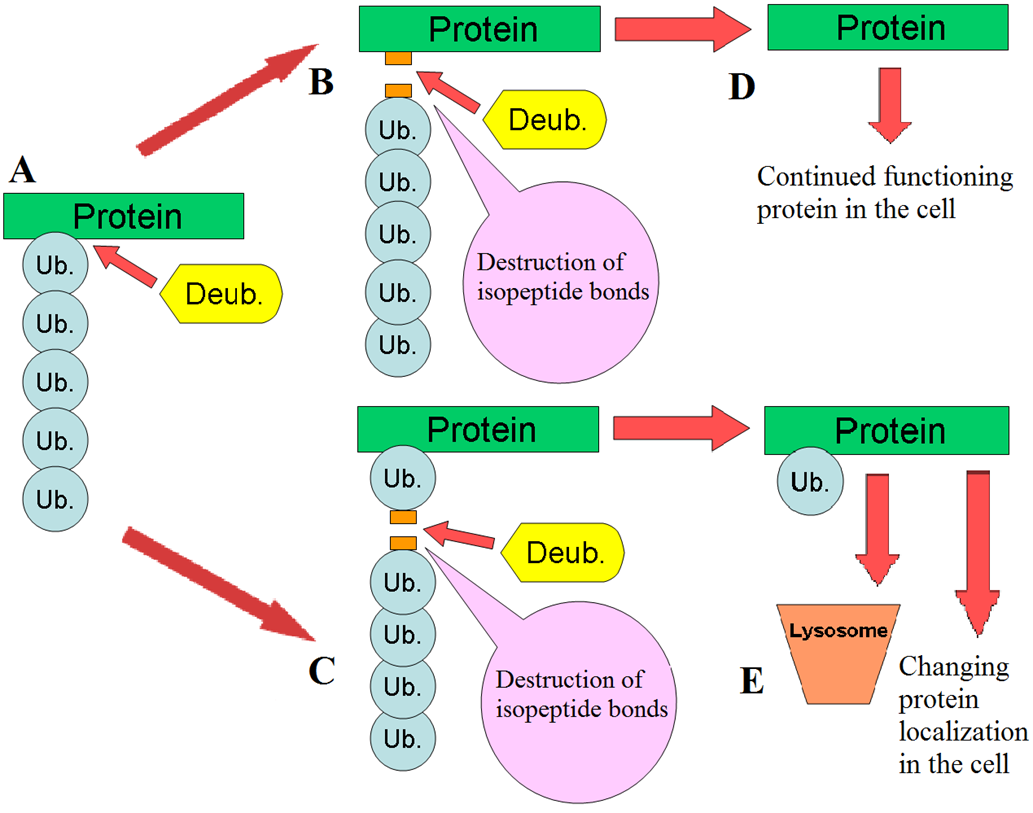
Schematic representation DUBs function

DUBs play several roles in the ubiquitin pathway. One of the best characterised functions of DUBs is the removal of monoubiquitin and polyubiquitin chains from proteins. These modifications are a post translational modification (addition to a protein after it has been made) where single ubiquitin proteins or chains of ubiquitin are added to lysines of a substrate protein. These ubiquitin modifications are added to proteins by the ubiquitination machinery; ubiquitin-activating enzymes (E1s), ubiquitin-conjugating enzymes (E2s) and ubiquitin ligases (E3s). The result is ubiquitin bound to lysine residues via an isopeptide bond. Proteins are affected by these modifications in a number of ways: they regulate the degradation of proteins via the proteasome and lysosome; coordinate the cellular localisation of proteins; activate and inactivate proteins; and modulate protein-protein interactions. DUBs play the antagonistic role in this axis by removing these modifications, therefore reversing the fate of the proteins. In addition, a less understood role of DUBs is the cleavage of ubiquitin-like proteins such as SUMO and NEDD8. Some DUBs may have the ability to cleave isopeptide bonds between these proteins and substrate proteins.

They activate ubiquitin by the proteolysis (breaking down) of the inactive expressed forms of ubiquitin. Ubiquitin is encoded in mammals by 4 different genes: UBA52, RPS27A, UBB and UBC. A similar set of genes is found in other eukaryotes such as yeast. The UBA52 and RPS27A genes produce ubiquitin that is fused to ribosomal proteins and the UBB and UBC genes produce polyubiquitin (a chain of ubiquitin joined by their C- and N-termini). DUBs cleave the ubiquitin from these proteins, producing active single units of ubiquitin.

DUBs also cleave single ubiquitin proteins that may have had their C-terminal tails accidentally bound to small cellular nucleophiles. These ubiquitin-amides and ubiquitin-thioesters may be formed during standard ubiquitination reactions by the E1-E2-E3 cascade. Glutathione and polyamines are two nucleophiles that might attack the thioester bond between ubiquitin and these enzymes. Ubiquitin C-terminal hydrolase is an example of the DUB that hydrolyses these bonds with broad specificity.

Free polyubiquitin chains are cleaved by DUBs to produce monoubiquitin. The chains may be produced by the E1-E2-E3 machinery in the cell free from any substrate protein. Another source of free polyubiquitin is the product of ubiquitin-substrate cleavage. If DUBs cleave the base of the polyubiquitin chain that is attached to a protein, the whole chain will become free and needs to be recycled by DUBs.

== Domains ==
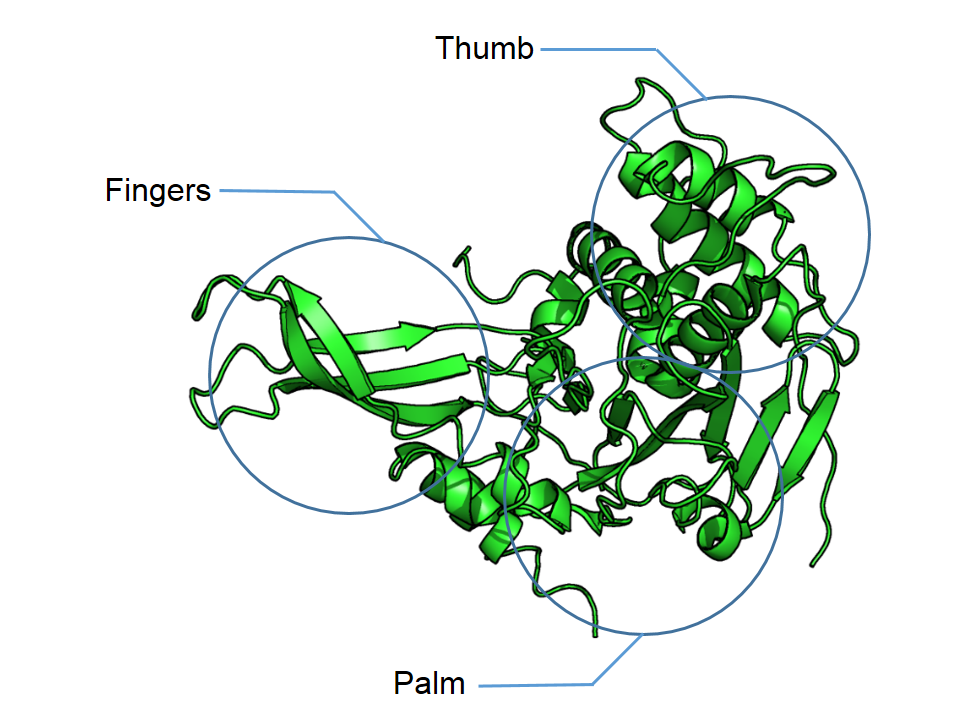
Catalytic domain of USP7. Catalytic domains of USPs can be visualised as the fingers palm and thumb of a hand. Ubiquitin fits into the hand with its C-terminus poking through between the thumb and palm.

DUBs often contain a catalytic domain surrounded by one or more accessory domains, some of which contribute to target recognition. These additional domains include domain present in ubiquitin-specific proteases (DUSP) domain; ubiquitin-like (UBL) domain; meprin and TRAF homology (MATH) domain; zinc-finger ubiquitin-specific protease (ZnF-UBP) domain; zinc-finger myeloid, nervy and DEAF1 (ZnF-MYND) domain; ubiquitin-associated (UBA) domain; CHORD-SGT1 (CS) domain; microtubule-interacting and trafficking (MIT) domain; rhodanese-like domain; TBC/RABGAP domain; and B-box domain.

=== Catalytic domain ===
The catalytic domain of DUBs is what classifies them into particular groups; USPs, OTUs, MJDs, UCHs and MPN+/JAMMs. The first 4 groups are cysteine proteases, whereas the latter is a zinc metalloprotease. The cysteine protease DUBs are papain-like and thus have a similar mechanism of action. They use either catalytic dyads or triads (either two or three amino acids) to catalyse the hydrolysis of the amide bonds between ubiquitin and the substrate. The active site residues that contribute to the catalytic activity of the cysteine protease DUBs are cysteine (dyad/triad), histidine (dyad/triad) and aspartate or asparagine (triad only). The histidine is polarised by the aspartate or asparagine in catalytic triads or by other ways in dyads. This polarised residue lowers the pKa of the cysteine, allowing it to perform a nucleophilic attack on the isopeptide bond between the ubiquitin C-terminus and the substrate lysine. Metalloproteases coordinate zinc ions with histidine, aspartate and serine residues, which activate water molecules and allows them to attack the isopeptide bond.

=== UBL ===
Ubiquitin-like (UBL) domains have a similar structure (fold) to ubiquitin, except they lack the terminal glycine residues. 18 USPs are proposed to have UBL domains. Only 2 other DUBs have UBLs outside the USP group: OTU1 and VCPIP1. USP4, USP7, USP11, USP15, USP32, USP40 and USP47 have multiple UBL domains. Sometimes the UBL domains are in tandem, such as in USP7 where 5 tandem C-terminal UBL domains are present. USP4, USP6, USP11, USP15, USP19, USP31, USP32 and USP43 have UBL domains inserted into the catalytic domain. The functions of UBL domains are different between USPs, but commonly they regulate USP catalytic activity. They can coordinate localisation at the proteasome (USP14); negatively regulate USPs by competing for the catalytic site of the USP (USP4), and induce conformational changes to increase catalytic activity (USP7). Like other UBL domains, the structure of USP UBL domains show a β-grasp fold.

=== DUSP ===
DUSP domain
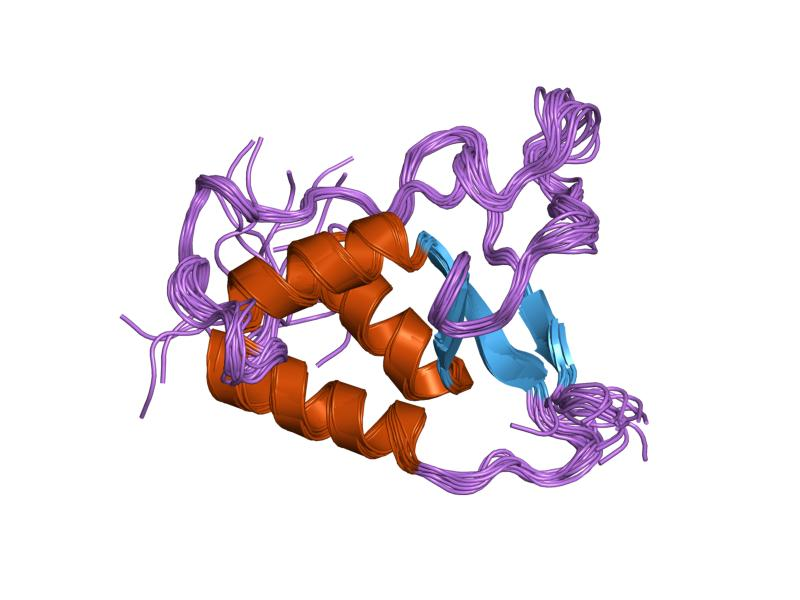
- Solution structure of the DUSP domain of HUSP15.

Identifiers
- Symbol: DUSP
- Pfam: PF06337
- InterPro: IPR006615
- MEROPS: C19
Available protein structures:
- PDB: IPR006615 PF06337 (ECOD; PDBsum)
- AlphaFold: IPR006615; PF06337

Single or multiple tandem DUSP domains of approximately 120 residues are found in six USPs. The function of the DUSP domain is currently unknown but it may play a role in protein-protein interaction, in particular to DUBs substrate recognition. This is predicted because of the hydrophobic cleft present in the DUSP domain of USP15 and that some protein interactions with DUSP containing USPs do not occur without these domains. The DUSP domain displays a novel tripod-like fold comprising three helices and an anti-parallel beta-sheet made of three strands. This fold resembles the legs (helices) and seat (beta-sheet) of the tripod. Within most DUSP domains in USPs there is a conserved sequence of amino acids known as the PGPI motif. This is a sequence of four amino acids; proline, glycine, proline and isoleucine, which packs against the three-helix bundle and is highly ordered.

== Role in disease ==
The full extent of the role of DUBs in diseases remains to be elucidated. Their involvement in disease is predicted due to known roles in physiological processes that are involved in disease states; including cancer and neurological disorders.

The enzyme USP28 is over-expressed in different types of cancer such as colon or lung. In addition, USP28 deubiquitinates and stabilizes important oncogenes such as c-Myc, Notch1, c-jun or ΔNp63. In squamous tumors, USP28 regulates the resistance to chemotherapy regulating DNA repair via ΔNp63-Fanconia anemia pathway axis.

The deubiquitinating enzymes UCH-L3 and YUH1 are able to hydrolyse mutant ubiquitin UBB+1 despite the fact that the glycine at position 76 is mutated.

UCH-L1 levels are high in various types of malignancies (cancer).

== Role in the cell cycle ==
DUBs play an active role in modulating the cell cycle. Ubiquitin-specific-processing protease (USP) is a family of deubiquitinating enzymes that play a crucial role in cell cycle regulation. Two such enzymes include USP17 and USP44. USP17 regulates pathways responsible for progressing cells through the cell cycle. Its targets include regulators of Ras, CDK2, and Cyclin A. USP44 plays an important role in anaphase initiation. New research into the mitotic checkpoint has revealed a novel role for USP44 in regulating cell cycle progression.

=== USP regulation of Ras ===
The ERK Pathway allows for the transduction of external mitogenic signals into intracellular signals promoting cellular proliferation. One of the key regulators of this pathways is Ras, a GTPase that, upon activation, binds GTP to "turn on" the subsequent signaling cascade. Ras converting enzyme 1 (RCE1) post-translationally cleaves the 3 residues on the C-terminus of Ras, allowing Ras to properly localize to the plasma membrane.

USP17 acts to deubiquitinate K63-ubiquitin domains on RCE1. Such stabilization of RCE1 allows for proper localization of Ras, thus promoting proliferation upon activation of early receptors in the ERK Pathway. Ras hyperactivity can result in cell cycle dysregulation. Thus, regulation of Ras through USP17 acts as another point in Ras regulation.

=== USP regulation of G1-S transition ===
Cyclin-dependent kinases (CDKs) are a family of enzymes that phosphorylate serine and threonine residues to drive the cell through the cell cycle. Activation of CDK2 is critical for the G1-S transition. For CDK2 to be activated, cyclin A must bind to the cyclin-dependent kinase complex (CDKC). Cell division cycle 25A (CDC25A) is a phosphatase that removes an inhibitory phosphate group from CDK2. While ubiquitination would mark CDC25A for degradation, thus blocking progression to S phase, USP17 deubiquitinates CDC25A. An increase in CDC25A stability promotes CDKC activity, thus driving the cell through the G1-S transition.

USP17 also regulates cell cycle progression by acting on SETD8 to downregulate transcription of cyclin-dependent kinase inhibitor 1 (CDKN1A), also known as p21. CDKN1A binds to and inhibits CDK2 using its N-terminal binding domain, thus blocking progression through the G1-S transition. SETD8, a methyltransferase, uses S-Adenosyl methionine to methylate the Lys20 residue of histone 4, resulting in the condensation of chromosomes. This compaction of the DNA downregulates CDKN1A transcription. USP17 deubiquitinates SETD8, thus reducing its propensity for degradation and increasing its intracellular stability. The resulting downregulation in CDKN1A transcription promotes CDK2 activity, allowing the cell to progress through the G1-S transition. See schematic of the role of DUBs in the cell cycle regulation.

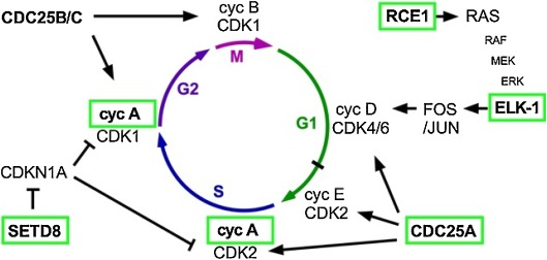
Schematic of the role of DUBs in the cell cycle regulation

=== USP44 in anaphase initiation ===
The spindle checkpoint (also referred to as the mitotic checkpoint) ensures proper separation of chromosomes. Broadly, the mitotic checkpoint promotes fidelity in chromosomal segregation, increasing the likelihood that each daughter cell receives only one duplicated chromosome. Such a mechanism is crucial, as errors in chromosomal separation have been implicated in cancer, birth defects, and antibiotic resistance in pathogens. One of the core regulator proteins is the anaphase-promoting complex (APC/C). APC/C ubiquitinates securin. The resulting destruction of securing release separase, which hydrolyzes cohesion – the protein that binds sister chromatids together.

New research from Stegmeier and colleagues published in the journal Nature demonstrates a crucial role for USP44 in regulating the spindle checkpoint. Using an shRNA screen, USP44 was identified to stabilize the inhibition of APC/C The binding of CDC20 to APC/C is required for the ubiquitination of securin. A protein called hMAD2 can form an inactive trimer with APC and CDC20, forming the hMAD2-CDC-APC complex. Upon the ubiquitination of CDC20 by UbcH10, hMAD2 dissociates, and APC/C becomes active. Ubiquitination of CDC20 does not serve to mark it for degradation, but rather promote dissociation of hMAD2 from the hMAD2-CDC-APC complex. USP44, a ubiquitin-specific-processing protease, can stabilize the inactive hMAD2-CDC-APC complex by counteracting UbcH10 ubiquitination. This blocks hMAD2 dissociation and allows for proper regulation of APC/C, keeping it inactive until proper attachment of the mitotic spindle. Upon proper attachment, switch-like behavior allows for the activation of APC/C. This results in the cleavage of cohesion, allowing for the separation of sister chromatids.

== Role in p53-mediated DNA damage repair ==
DNA damage can prove catastrophic for an organism. Mechanisms for DNA mutation include oxidative stress, DNA replication errors, exogenous carcinogens, radiation, and spontaneous base mutation. Upon DNA damage, cell cycle progression is halted to prevent propagation of the mutation. The TP53 gene (also known as p53) is crucial in ensuring the conservation of the genome. Deubiquitinating enzymes play an integral role in maintaining p53's function.

In healthy cells, p53 activates the E3 ubiquitin ligase MDM2 which in turn ubiquitinates p53. This creates a negative feedback loop, whereby the degradation of p53 allows for cells to flow through the cell cycle. Upon DNA damage, Ubiquitin-specific-processing protease 7 (USP7) stabilizes p53 by cleaving ubiquitin. For USP7 to deubiquitinate p53, it must localize to the nucleus. However, no nuclear localization sequence (NLS) has been found. Despite no known NLS, one study showed that, upon deletion of USP7's N-terminus, no nuclear localization occurred. It is possible that other proteins facilitate nuclear entry of USP7.

Once stabilized, p53 can exert its tumor suppression function. Downstream pathways of p53 act to either halt cell cycle progression in G1 or G2 phases of the cell cycle or promote cell-death, depending on the severity of the DNA damage. See schematic of the role of USP7 in the p53-dependent pathway. or promote cell-death, depending on the severity of the DNA damage. See schematic of the role of USP7 in the p53-dependent pathway.

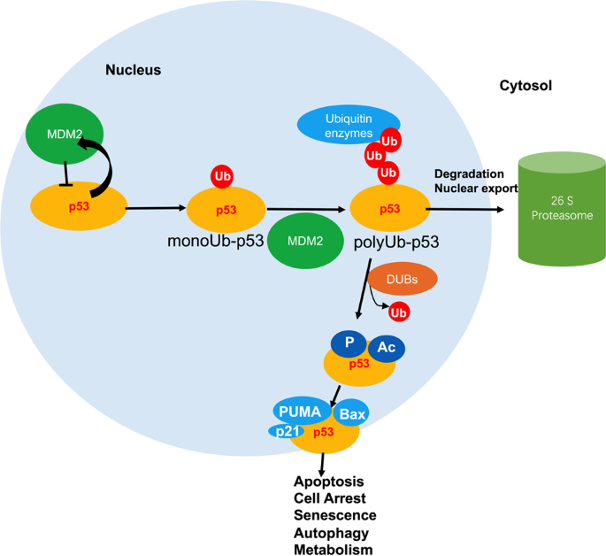
Schematic of the role of USP7 in the p53-dependent pathway.
