= Benedikt Kessler =

Swiss researcher and academic

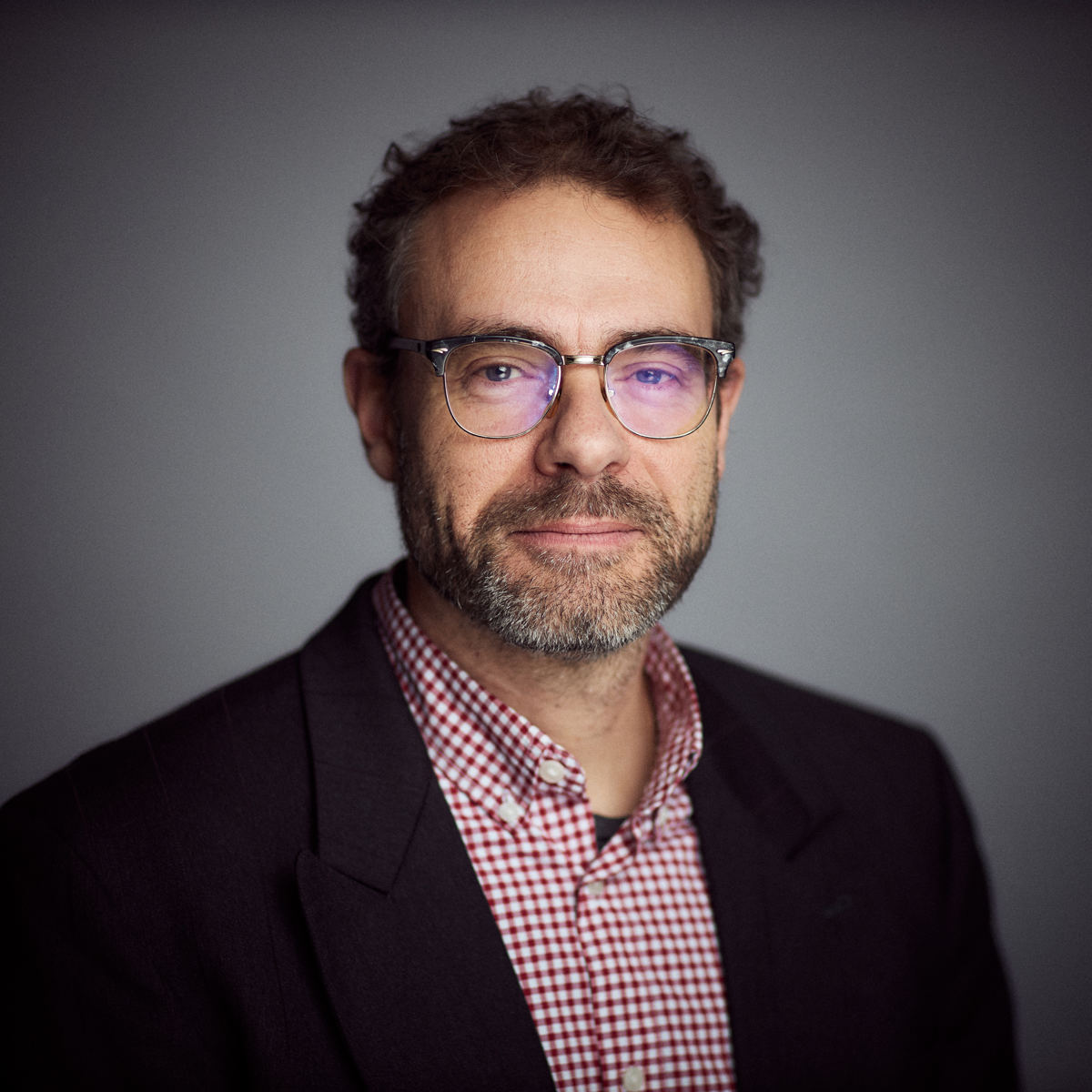

Academic background
- Education: B.A., Biochemistry; Ph.D., Immunology
- Alma mater: Swiss Federal Institute of Technology; Ludwig Institute for Cancer Research

Academic work
- Institutions: University of Oxford

Benedikt Kessler is a Swiss researcher and academic. He is Professor of Biochemistry and Mass Spectrometry at the Target Discovery Institute, University of Oxford.

Kessler's research has been focused on ubiquitin and protease biology. Some of his work has dealt with defining the molecular signatures in human disease processes and accelerating target discovery in translational research. He holds three patents.

Kessler is a member of the British Mass Spectrometry Society, the British Society of Cell Biology and the American Association for Cancer Research.. He has been on the Scientific Advisory Board of Stablix, Omos Health and Oxcan. He received his Ph.D. in Immunology from the Ludwig Institute for Cancer Research and completed post-doctoral training at Harvard Medical School.

== Education ==
Kessler received a B.A. in Biochemistry from Swiss Federal Institute of Technology in 1992. He then joined Ludwig Institute for Cancer Research where he received his Ph.D. in Immunology. He completed his post-doctoral training at Harvard Medical School in the laboratory of Hidde Ploegh where he studied the role of proteolysis in antigen processing and presentation.

== Career ==
In 2001, Kessler joined the Harvard Medical School as an Instructor in Pathology. He left Harvard in 2004 and moved to the United Kingdom, where he joined the University of Oxford as a Research Group Leader. Later he started teaching at the University of Oxford, becoming a Full Professor of Biochemistry & Life Science Mass Spectrometry in 2014.

Kessler was part of the DUB Alliance, a group that is working to develop novel drugs against deubiquitylating enzymes (DUBs). He has been a member of the Innovative Technology Enabling Network (ITEN), a scientific consortium that explores DUBs as cancer targets coordinated by Pfizer.

=== Research and work ===
Kessler has been studying major histocompatibility complex (MHC) class I antigens using HPLC-based analysis since 1993 and mass spectrometry-based approaches to study the ubiquitin-proteasome pathway since 2000. In 2005, he established his own group at the University of Oxford, Nuffield Department of Medicine (NDM), with a focus on ubiquitin and protease biology, biological mass spectrometry and proteomics. Kessler relocated his laboratory to the Target Discovery Institute (TDI) in 2013.

Kessler has made contributions to explain the action of novel clinical drugs (Velcade, Carfilzomib, Kyprolis) for the treatment of Multiple Myeloma patients, and to the discovery of potentially clinically exploitable cancer targets within the ubiquitin system, in particular deubiquitylating enzymes (DUBs). The Kessler group also provided the framework for uncovering molecular signatures associated with human diseases via clinical proteomics, metabolomics and enabling drug discovery by structural proteomics.

The Kessler Lab has been developing chemoproteomics methods to profile active ubiquitin processing enzymes, in particular deubiquitylating enzymes (DUBs) and the dynamic ubiquitome. Ubiquitin-based active site directed probes were developed that allowed the profiling of the active cellular content of the DUB enzyme family. This approach was also used to demonstrate the involvement of otubain 1 (OTUB1) in infection and prostate cancer, the role of USP4 and USP47 in DNA repair mechanisms and USP18 in immuno-oncology. In particular, Kessler's work contributed to the characterisation of small molecule DUB inhibitors as novel potential therapeutic agents against USP30 in Parkinson's disease, USP28 in squamous lung carcinoma and USP7 in multiple myeloma.

== Awards and honors ==
- Cesar Roux Research Award of the Faculty of Medicine, Lausanne University
- Human Frontier Science Program Organization long-term fellowship
- Roche Research Foundation post-doctoral fellowship
- Recipient of a Multiple Myeloma Research Foundation (MMRF) Senior Research Award
- Member of the British Society of Mass Spectrometry and British Society of Cell Biology
- Member of the American Association for Cancer Research (AACR)
- NIH study section member in 2003 and 2004: Bio-warfare and infectious diseases
- Wellcome Trust VIP Award 2005
- MRC New Investigator Award 2006-2009

== Selected publications ==
- Borodovsky, A., Ovaa, H., Kolli, N., Gan-Erdene, T., Wilkinson, K. D., Ploegh, H. L., Kessler, B. M. (2002) Chemistry-based functional proteomics reveals novel members of the deubiquitinating enzyme family. Cell Chem Biol. Oct;9(10):1149-59.
- Hemelaar, J., Galardy, P. J., Borodovsky, A., Kessler, B. M., Ploegh, H. L., & Ovaa, H. (2004). Chemistry-based functional proteomics: mechanism-based activity-profiling tools for ubiquitin and ubiquitin-like specific proteases.. Journal of proteome research, 3(2), 268-276.
- Altun, M., Galardy, P. J., Shringarpure, R., Hideshima, T., LeBlanc, R., Anderson, K. C., . . . Kessler, B. M. (2005). Effects of PS-341 on the activity and composition of proteasomes in multiple myeloma cells.. Cancer research, 65(17), 7896-7901.
- Edelmann, M. J., Kramer, H. B., Altun, M., & Kessler, B. M. (2010). Post-translational modification of the deubiquitinating enzyme otubain 1 modulates active RhoA levels and susceptibility to Yersinia invasion.. The FEBS journal, 277(11), 2515-2530.
- Kramer, H. B., Simmons, A., Gasper-Smith, N., Borrow, P., Lavender, K. J., Qin, L., . . . Kessler, B. M. (2010). Elevation of intact and proteolytic fragments of acute phase proteins constitutes the earliest systemic antiviral response in HIV-1 infection.. PLoS Pathog, 6(5).
- Parsons, J. L., Dianova, I. I., Khoronenkova, S. V., Edelmann, M. J., Kessler, B. M., & Dianov, G. L. (2011). USP47 is a deubiquitylating enzyme that regulates base excision repair by controlling steady-state levels of DNA polymerase β.. Molecular Cell, 41(5), 609-615.
- Altun, M., Kramer, H. B., Willems, L. I., McDermott, J. L., Leach, C. A., Goldenberg, S. J., . . . Kessler, B. M. (2011). Activity-based chemical proteomics accelerates inhibitor development for deubiquitylating enzymes.. Chemistry & Biology, 18(11), 1401-1412.
- Chauhan, D., Tian, Z., Nicholson, B., Kumar, K. G. S., Zhou, B., Carrasco, R., . . . Kodrasov, M. P. (2012). A small molecule inhibitor of ubiquitin-specific protease-7 induces apoptosis in multiple myeloma cells and overcomes bortezomib resistance.. Cancer Cell, 22(3), 345-358.
- Konietnzy, R., Wijnhoven, P., Blackford, A. N., Kessler, B. M., Travers, J., Nishi, R., & Jackson, S. P. (2015). USP4 auto-deubiquitylation promotes homologous recombination. Molecular Cell, 60(3), 362-373.
- Huang, H., van Dullemen, L., Akhtar, M., Lo Faro, M. L., Yu, Z., Valli, A., . . . Kessler, B. M. (2018). Proteo-metabolomics reveals compensation between ischemic and non-injured contralateral kidneys after reperfusion. Scientific Reports, Jun 4;8(1):8539.
- Pinto-Fernández, A., Davis, S., Schofield, A.B., Scott, H.C., Zhang, P., Salah, E., Zhang, P., Charles, P., Mathea, S., Damianou, A., Fischer, R., Kessler, B. M. (2019). Comprehensive Landscape of Active Deubiquitinating Enzymes Profiled by Advanced Chemoproteomics. Frontiers in Chemistry, Aug 29;7:592.
- Pinto-Fernández, A., Salio, M., Partridge, T., Chen, J., Vere, G., Greenwood, H., Olie, C.S., Damianou, A., Scott, H.C., ...... Kessler B. M. (2021). Deletion of the deISGylating enzyme USP18 enhances tumour cell antigenicity and radiosensitivity. Br J Cancer, Feb;124(4):817-830.
- Damianou, A., Jones, H. B. L., Grigoriou, A., Akbor, M. A., Jenkins, E., Charles, P. D., Vendrell, I., Davis, S., Kessler, B. M. (2025). Integrative proximal-ubiquitomics profiling for deubiquitinase substrate discovery applied to USP30. Cell Chem Biol. May 15;32(5):736-751.e8.
