= UNP =

UNP may refer to:

== Politics ==
- Ukrains'ka Narodna Partiya, a political party in Ukraine
- United National Party, a political party in Sri Lanka
- United Nationalist Party, a former political party in Ghana
- United Newfoundland Party, a former political party in Newfoundland, Canada
- United Nigerian Party, which merged into the United Nigeria Congress Party

== Others ==
- Unp, an abbreviation of the previous name, unnilpentium, for the chemical element Dubnium
- A synonym for the enzyme USP4
- The NYSE listing for the Union Pacific Corporation
- National University of the Patagonia San Juan Bosco (Universidad Nacional de la Patagonia San Juan Bosco) in Argentina
- State University of Padang (Universitas Negeri Padang), a university in Indonesia
- University of Nebraska Press
- University of Northern Philippines, a public university in Ilocos Sur province
- University Nanosatellite Program
