= Ub-AMC =

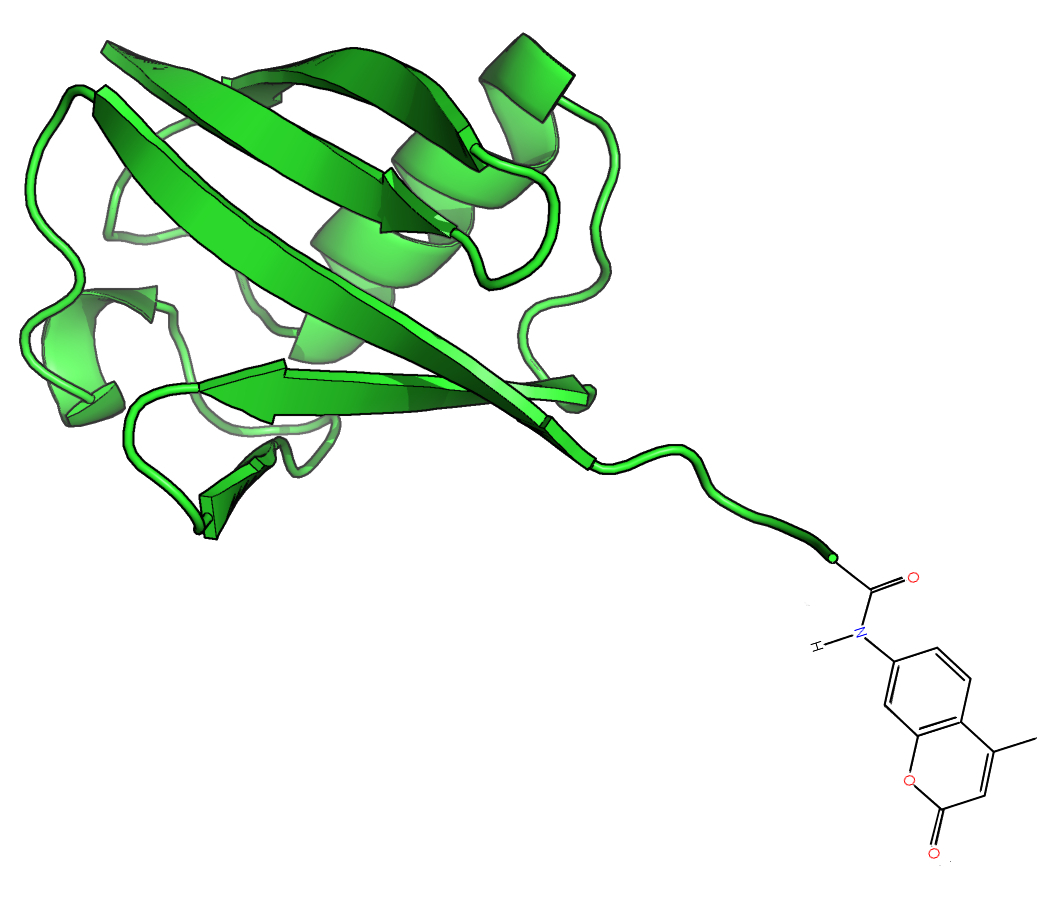
Ubiquitin-AMC showing 7-amino-4-methylcoumarin bound to the C-terminus of ubiquitin

Ubiquitin-AMC is a fluorogenic substrate for a wide range of deubiquitinating enzymes (DUBs), including ubiquitin C-terminal hydrolases (UCHs) and ubiquitin specific proteases (USPs). It is a particularly useful reagent for the study of deubiquitinating activity where detection sensitivity or continuous monitoring of activity is essential.

== Background ==
Ubiquitin-AMC is prepared by the C-terminal derivatization of ubiquitin with 7-amino-4-methylcoumarin and has been shown to be a useful and sensitive fluorogenic substrate for wide range of deubiquitinylating enzymes (DUBs), including ubiquitin C-terminal hydrolases (UCHs) and ubiquitin specific proteases (USPs).

Ubiquitin-AMC has been shown to be a sensitive substrate for UCH-L3 (Km = 0.039 μM) and for Isopeptidase-T (Km = 0.17-1.4 μM), and is particularly useful for studying deubiquitinylating activity where detection sensitivity or continuous monitoring of activity is essential.

Typical assay set-up: Assay substrate concentration: 0.01-1.0 μM. Enzyme concentrations, UCH-L3: 10-100pM, isopeptidase-T: 10-100nM. Release of AMC fluorescence by DUB enzymes can be monitored using 380 nm excitation and 460 nm emission wavelengths.

== Uses ==
1. Substrate for deubiquitinylating enzyme activity assays.
2. Identification/confirmation of enzyme deubiquitinylation activity.
3. Investigation of deconjugating enzyme substrate specificity in comparison with alternative UBL-AMC substrates (e.g. NEDD8-AMC)
