= OTUB2 =

Protein-coding gene in the species Homo sapiens

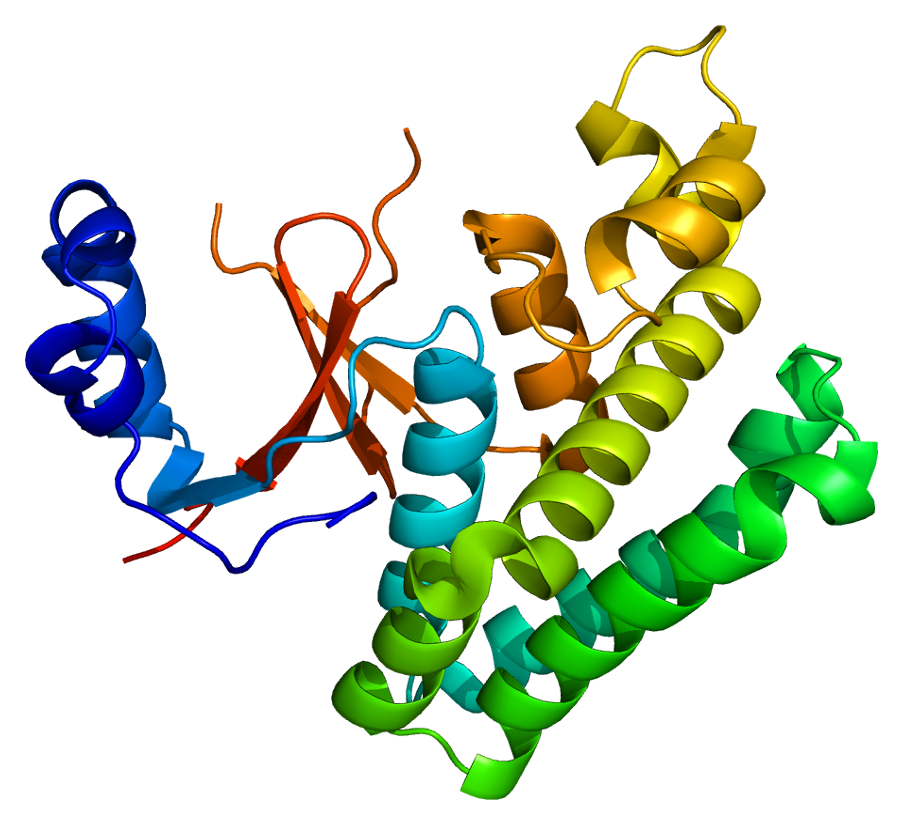

Identifiers
- Aliases: OTUB2, C14orf137, OTB2, OTU2, OTU deubiquitinase, ubiquitin aldehyde binding 2
- External IDs: OMIM: 608338; MGI: 1915399; GeneCards: OTUB2
Available structures
PDB	Ortholog search: PDBe RCSB
PDB	List of PDB id codes 1TFF, 4FJV
Enzyme activity
EC #	BRENDA	ExPASy	KEGG	MetaCyc
3.4.19.12	↗	↗	↗	↗

Gene location (Human)
Chr.	Chromosome 14 (human)
Band	14q32.12	Start	94,026,340 bp
Band	14q32.12	End	94,048,930 bp

Gene location (Mouse)
Chr.	Chromosome 12 (mouse)
Band	12|12 E	Start	103,354,941 bp
Band	12|12 E	End	103,372,609 bp
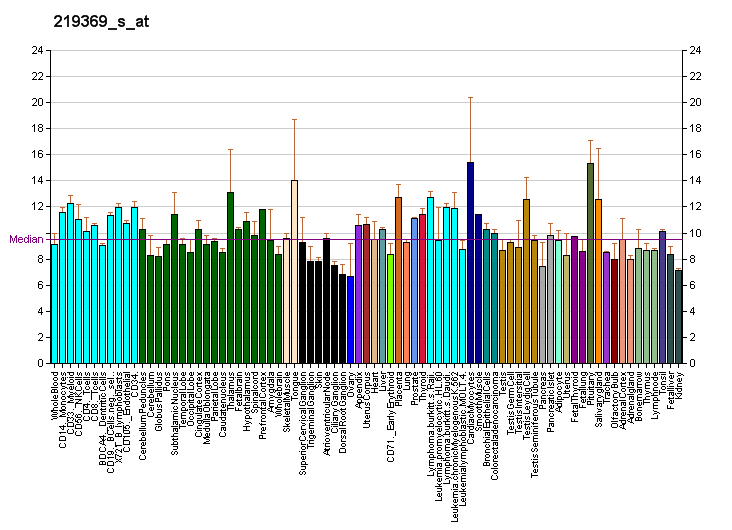
RNA expression pattern
Bgee	Human / Mouse (ortholog); Top expressed in: testicle; left testis; right testis; skin of leg; ventricular zone; gonad; skin of abdomen; ganglionic eminence; placenta; islet of Langerhans / Top expressed in: seminiferous tubule; spermatid; esophagus; primary oocyte; lip; dentate gyrus of hippocampal formation granule cell; zygote; Region I of hippocampus proper; lacrimal gland; secondary oocyte; More reference expression data
BioGPS	More reference expression data
Gene ontology
Molecular function	thiol-dependent deubiquitinase; peptidase activity; cysteine-type peptidase activity; NEDD8-specific protease activity; ubiquitin binding; protein binding; hydrolase activity
Cellular component	nucleus
Biological process	protein deubiquitination; protein K63-linked deubiquitination; protein K48-linked deubiquitination; proteolysis; protein K11-linked deubiquitination
Sources:Amigo / QuickGO
Orthologs
Databases	NCBI: entry; OMA: entry
Species	Human	Mouse
Entrez	78990	68149
Ensembl	ENSG00000089723; ENSG00000277276	ENSMUSG00000021203
UniProt	Q96DC9	Q9CQX0
RefSeq (mRNA)	NM_023112	NM_001177841; NM_026580
RefSeq (protein)	NP_075601	NP_001171312; NP_080856
Location (UCSC)	Chr 14: 94.03 – 94.05 Mb	Chr 12: 103.35 – 103.37 Mb
PubMed search
- Wikidata
View/Edit Human	View/Edit Mouse

Ubiquitin thioesterase OTUB2 is an enzyme that in humans is encoded by the OTUB2 gene.

Otubains are deubiquitinating cysteine proteases (DUBs; see MIM 602519) that belong to the ovarian tumor (OTU) protein superfamily. Like other DUBs, otubains cleave proteins precisely at the ubiquitin (UB; see MIM 191339)-protein bond.
