= USP36 =

Protein-coding gene in the species Homo sapiens

Identifiers
- Aliases: USP36, DUB1, ubiquitin specific peptidase 36
- External IDs: OMIM: 612543; MGI: 1919594; GeneCards: USP36
Enzyme activity
EC #	BRENDA	ExPASy	KEGG	MetaCyc
3.4.19.12	↗	↗	↗	↗

Gene location (Human)
Chr.	Chromosome 17 (human)
Band	17q25.3	Start	78,787,381 bp
Band	17q25.3	End	78,841,441 bp

Gene location (Mouse)
Chr.	Chromosome 11 (mouse)
Band	11|11 E2	Start	118,150,477 bp
Band	11|11 E2	End	118,181,070 bp
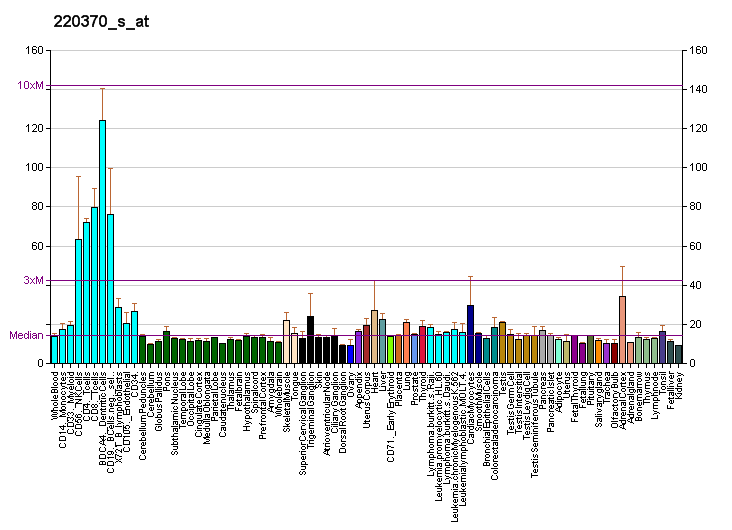
RNA expression pattern
Bgee	Human / Mouse (ortholog); Top expressed in: sural nerve; anterior pituitary; left ovary; right ovary; left uterine tube; body of pancreas; right hemisphere of cerebellum; skin of leg; skin of abdomen; gastric mucosa / Top expressed in: Rostral migratory stream; zygote; genital tubercle; primitive streak; neural layer of retina; tail of embryo; lacrimal gland; muscle of thigh; epiblast; otic vesicle; More reference expression data
BioGPS	More reference expression data
Gene ontology
Molecular function	thiol-dependent deubiquitinase; peptidase activity; cysteine-type peptidase activity; hydrolase activity; RNA binding
Cellular component	nucleolus; nucleus; nuclear speck
Biological process	protein deubiquitination; regulation of autophagy of mitochondrion; ubiquitin-dependent protein catabolic process; positive regulation of protein targeting to mitochondrion; proteolysis
Sources:Amigo / QuickGO
Orthologs
Databases	NCBI: entry; OMA: entry
Species	Human	Mouse
Entrez	57602	72344
Ensembl	ENSG00000055483	ENSMUSG00000033909
UniProt	Q9P275	B1AQJ2
RefSeq (mRNA)	NM_025090; NM_001321291	NM_001033528
RefSeq (protein)	NP_001308220	NP_001028700
Location (UCSC)	Chr 17: 78.79 – 78.84 Mb	Chr 11: 118.15 – 118.18 Mb
PubMed search
- Wikidata
View/Edit Human	View/Edit Mouse

Ubiquitin-specific protease 36 is an enzyme that in humans is encoded by the USP36 gene.

This gene encodes a member of the ubiquitin-specific protease family of proteases that is a deubiquitinating enzyme (DUB) with His and Cys domains. This protein is located in the nucleoli and deubiquitinate nucleophosmin and fibrillarin
