= USP25 =

Protein-coding gene in the species Homo sapiens

Identifiers
- Aliases: USP25, USP21, ubiquitin specific peptidase 25
- External IDs: OMIM: 604736; MGI: 1353655; GeneCards: USP25
Available structures
PDB	Ortholog search: PDBe RCSB
PDB	List of PDB id codes 2MUX
Enzyme activity
EC #	BRENDA	ExPASy	KEGG	MetaCyc
3.4.19.12	↗	↗	↗	↗

Gene location (Human)
Chr.	Chromosome 21 (human)
Band	21q21.1	Start	15,729,982 bp
Band	21q21.1	End	15,880,064 bp

Gene location (Mouse)
Chr.	Chromosome 16 (mouse)
Band	16|16 C3.1	Start	76,810,594 bp
Band	16|16 C3.1	End	76,913,668 bp
RNA expression pattern
Bgee	Human / Mouse (ortholog); Top expressed in: sperm; Skeletal muscle tissue of rectus abdominis; glutes; amniotic fluid; muscle of thigh; biceps brachii; Achilles tendon; Skeletal muscle tissue of biceps brachii; gastrocnemius muscle; vastus lateralis muscle / Top expressed in: muscle of thigh; knee joint; ciliary body; spermatid; blood; vastus lateralis muscle; granulocyte; fetal liver hematopoietic progenitor cell; genital tubercle; esophagus; More reference expression data
BioGPS	n/a
Gene ontology
Molecular function	ATPase binding; peptidase activity; cysteine-type peptidase activity; ubiquitin binding; protein binding; hydrolase activity; ubiquitin protein ligase binding; thiol-dependent deubiquitinase; ubiquitin-like protein-specific protease activity; cysteine-type endopeptidase activity
Cellular component	endoplasmic reticulum; nucleus; cytoplasm; cytosol
Biological process	protein K63-linked deubiquitination; protein K48-linked deubiquitination; negative regulation of ERAD pathway; ubiquitin-dependent protein catabolic process; proteolysis; protein deubiquitination; regulation of protein stability
Sources:Amigo / QuickGO
Orthologs
Databases	NCBI: entry; OMA: entry
Species	Human	Mouse
Entrez	29761	30940
Ensembl	ENSG00000155313	ENSMUSG00000022867
UniProt	Q9UHP3	P57080
RefSeq (mRNA)	NM_001283041; NM_001283042; NM_013396; NM_001352560; NM_001352561 NM_001388299; NM_001388300; NM_001388301; NM_001388302	NM_013918
RefSeq (protein)	NP_001269970; NP_001269971; NP_037528; NP_001339489; NP_001339490	NP_038946
Location (UCSC)	Chr 21: 15.73 – 15.88 Mb	Chr 16: 76.81 – 76.91 Mb
PubMed search
- Wikidata
View/Edit Human	View/Edit Mouse

Ubiquitin specific peptidase 25 is a protein that in humans is encoded by the USP25 gene.

== Function ==
Ubiquitin is a highly conserved 76-amino acid protein involved in regulation of intracellular protein breakdown, cell cycle regulation, and stress response. Ubiquitin is released from degraded proteins by disassembly of the polyubiquitin chains, which is mediated by ubiquitin-specific proteases (USPs), such as USP25 (Valero et al., 1999 [PubMed 10644437]).[supplied by OMIM, Mar 2008].
