= USP15 =

Protein-coding gene in the species Homo sapiens

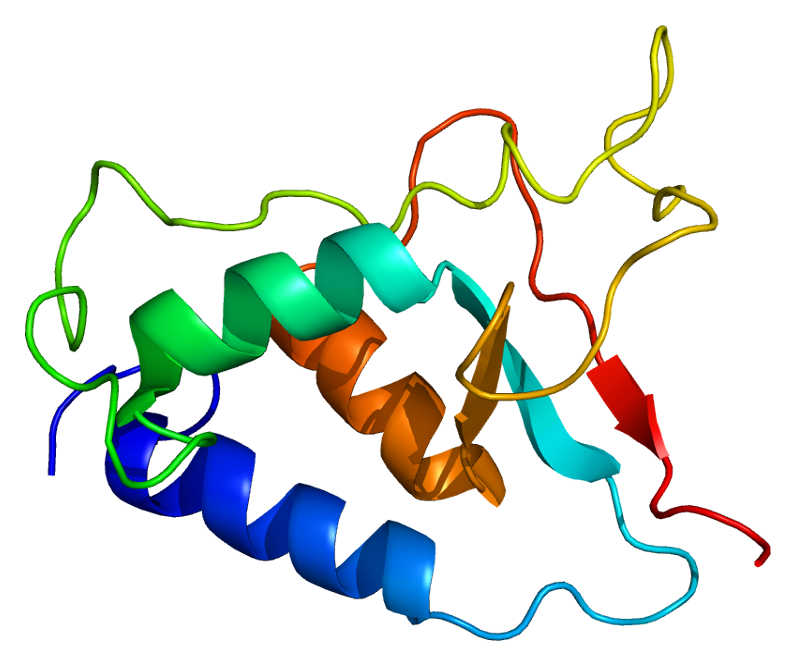

Identifiers
- Aliases: USP15, UNPH-2, UNPH4, ubiquitin specific peptidase 15
- External IDs: OMIM: 604731; MGI: 101857; GeneCards: USP15
Available structures
PDB	Ortholog search: PDBe RCSB
PDB	List of PDB id codes 1W6V, 3LMN, 3PPA, 3PV1, 3T9L, 4A3O, 4A3P, 5JJW
Enzyme activity
EC #	BRENDA	ExPASy	KEGG	MetaCyc
3.4.19.12	↗	↗	↗	↗

Gene location (Mouse)
Chr.	Chromosome 10 (mouse)
Band	10|10 D2	Start	122,940,911 bp
Band	10|10 D2	End	123,032,900 bp
Gene ontology
Molecular function	ubiquitin modification-dependent histone binding; cysteine-type peptidase activity; peptidase activity; protein binding; catalytic activity; thiol-dependent deubiquitinase; identical protein binding; transforming growth factor beta receptor binding; cysteine-type endopeptidase activity; SMAD binding; hydrolase activity
Cellular component	cytoplasm; nucleus; cytosol; mitochondrion
Biological process	pathway-restricted SMAD protein phosphorylation; ubiquitin-dependent protein catabolic process; monoubiquitinated protein deubiquitination; BMP signaling pathway; proteolysis; histone H2B conserved C-terminal lysine deubiquitination; transforming growth factor beta receptor signaling pathway; protein deubiquitination
Sources:Amigo / QuickGO
Orthologs
Databases	NCBI: entry; OMA: entry
Species	Human	Mouse
Entrez	9958	14479
Ensembl	ENSG00000135655	ENSMUSG00000020124
UniProt	Q9Y4E8	Q8R5H1
RefSeq (mRNA)	NM_001252078; NM_001252079; NM_006313	NM_001301628; NM_027604
RefSeq (protein)	NP_001239007; NP_001239008; NP_006304; NP_001338088; NP_001338089 NP_001338090; NP_001338091; NP_001338092; NP_001338093; NP_001338094; NP_001338095	NP_001288557; NP_081880
Location (UCSC)	n/a	Chr 10: 122.94 – 123.03 Mb
PubMed search
- Wikidata
View/Edit Human	View/Edit Mouse

Ubiquitin carboxyl-terminal hydrolase 15 is an enzyme that in humans is encoded by the USP15 gene.

Ubiquitin is a highly conserved protein involved in the regulation of intracellular protein breakdown, cell cycle regulation, and stress response, which is released from degraded proteins by disassembly of the polyubiquitin chains. The disassembly process is mediated by ubiquitin-specific proteases (USPs).

== See also ==
- USP1 (MIM 603478).
