= USP16 =

Protein-coding gene in the species Homo sapiens

Identifiers
- Aliases: USP16, UBP-M, UBPM, ubiquitin specific peptidase 16
- External IDs: OMIM: 604735; MGI: 1921362; GeneCards: USP16
Available structures
PDB	Ortholog search: PDBe RCSB
PDB	List of PDB id codes 2I50
Enzyme activity
EC #	BRENDA	ExPASy	KEGG	MetaCyc
3.4.19.12	↗	↗	↗	↗

Gene location (Human)
Chr.	Chromosome 21 (human)
Band	21q21.3	Start	29,024,629 bp
Band	21q21.3	End	29,054,488 bp

Gene location (Mouse)
Chr.	Chromosome 16 (mouse)
Band	16|16 C3.3	Start	87,454,703 bp
Band	16|16 C3.3	End	87,483,517 bp
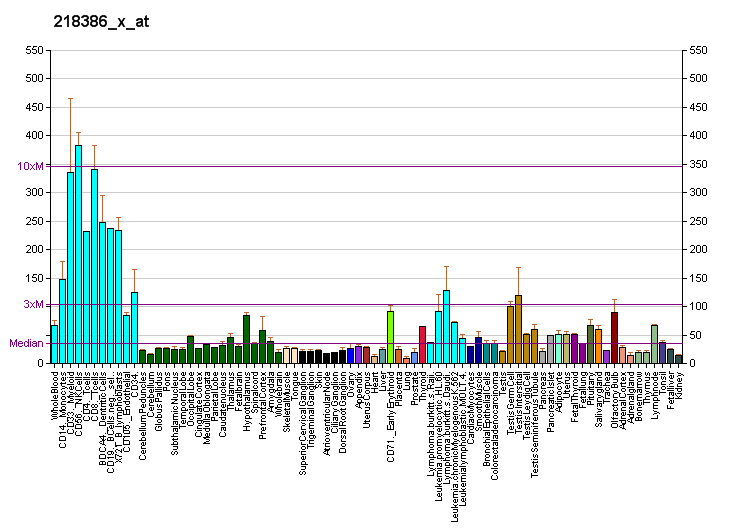
RNA expression pattern
Bgee	Human / Mouse (ortholog); Top expressed in: oocyte; sperm; epithelium of nasopharynx; Achilles tendon; pylorus; secondary oocyte; epithelium of colon; tendon of biceps brachii; parietal pleura; cardia / Top expressed in: zygote; morula; tail of embryo; genital tubercle; spermatid; muscle of thigh; seminiferous tubule; parotid gland; soleus muscle; seminal vesicula; More reference expression data
BioGPS	More reference expression data
Gene ontology
Molecular function	cysteine-type peptidase activity; zinc ion binding; metal ion binding; peptidase activity; hydrolase activity; transcription coactivator activity; cysteine-type endopeptidase activity; histone binding; ubiquitin binding; thiol-dependent deubiquitinase
Cellular component	cytoplasm; nucleus; nucleoplasm
Biological process	regulation of transcription, DNA-templated; ubiquitin-dependent protein catabolic process; positive regulation of translational elongation; regulation of transcription by RNA polymerase II; monoubiquitinated histone H2A deubiquitination; transcription, DNA-templated; proteolysis; cellular response to DNA damage stimulus; cell division; histone H2A K63-linked deubiquitination; positive regulation of transcription by RNA polymerase II; protein deubiquitination; positive regulation of transcription, DNA-templated; protein homotetramerization; regulation of gene expression; histone deubiquitination; regulation of cell cycle; mitotic cell cycle; chromatin organization; cell cycle; mitotic nuclear division
Sources:Amigo / QuickGO
Orthologs
Databases	NCBI: entry; OMA: entry
Species	Human	Mouse
Entrez	10600	74112
Ensembl	ENSG00000156256	ENSMUSG00000025616
UniProt	Q9Y5T5	Q99LG0
RefSeq (mRNA)	NM_006447; NM_001001992; NM_001032410	NM_024258
RefSeq (protein)	NP_001001992; NP_001027582; NP_006438	NP_077220
Location (UCSC)	Chr 21: 29.02 – 29.05 Mb	Chr 16: 87.45 – 87.48 Mb
PubMed search
- Wikidata
View/Edit Human	View/Edit Mouse

Ubiquitin carboxyl-terminal hydrolase 16 is an enzyme that in humans is encoded by the USP16 gene.

This gene encodes a deubiquitinating enzyme that is phosphorylated at the onset of mitosis and then dephosphorylated at the metaphase/anaphase transition. It can deubiquitinate H2A, one of two major ubiquitinated proteins of chromatin, in vitro and a mutant form of the protein was shown to block cell division. Alternate transcriptional splice variants, encoding different isoforms, have been characterized.
