= USP37 =

Protein-coding gene in the species Homo sapiens

Identifiers
- Aliases: USP37, ubiquitin specific peptidase 37
- External IDs: MGI: 2442483; GeneCards: USP37
Available structures
PDB	Ortholog search: PDBe RCSB
PDB	List of PDB id codes 3U12
Enzyme activity
EC #	BRENDA	ExPASy	KEGG	MetaCyc
3.4.19.12	↗	↗	↗	↗

Gene location (Human)
Chr.	Chromosome 2 (human)
Band	2q35	Start	218,450,251 bp
Band	2q35	End	218,568,351 bp

Gene location (Mouse)
Chr.	Chromosome 1 (mouse)
Band	1|1 C3- C4	Start	74,474,670 bp
Band	1|1 C3- C4	End	74,583,443 bp
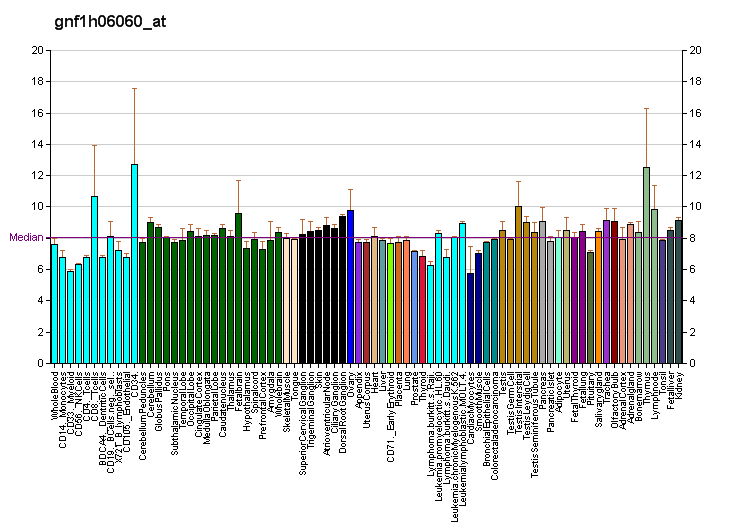
RNA expression pattern
Bgee	Human / Mouse (ortholog); Top expressed in: secondary oocyte; Achilles tendon; sperm; testicle; gonad; epithelium of colon; corpus callosum; thymus; skin of arm; Skeletal muscle tissue of rectus abdominis / Top expressed in: spermatocyte; spermatid; hand; zygote; secondary oocyte; otolith organ; utricle; tail of embryo; primary oocyte; genital tubercle; More reference expression data
BioGPS	More reference expression data
Gene ontology
Molecular function	peptidase activity; cysteine-type endopeptidase activity; cysteine-type peptidase activity; protein binding; protein kinase binding; hydrolase activity; thiol-dependent deubiquitinase
Cellular component	nucleus; nucleoplasm
Biological process	cell cycle; protein K48-linked deubiquitination; ubiquitin-dependent protein catabolic process; protein K11-linked deubiquitination; proteolysis; cell division; regulation of DNA replication; protein deubiquitination; G1/S transition of mitotic cell cycle
Sources:Amigo / QuickGO
Orthologs
Databases	NCBI: entry; OMA: entry
Species	Human	Mouse
Entrez	57695	319651
Ensembl	ENSG00000135913	ENSMUSG00000033364
UniProt	Q86T82	Q8C0R0
RefSeq (mRNA)	NM_020935	NM_176972; NM_001310662
RefSeq (protein)	NP_065986	NP_001297591; NP_795946
Location (UCSC)	Chr 2: 218.45 – 218.57 Mb	Chr 1: 74.47 – 74.58 Mb
PubMed search
- Wikidata
View/Edit Human	View/Edit Mouse

Ubiquitin specific processing protease 37 is an enzyme that in humans, is encoded by the USP37 gene.
