= USP24 =

Protein-coding gene in humans

Identifiers
- Aliases: USP24, ubiquitin specific peptidase 24
- External IDs: OMIM: 610569; MGI: 1919936; GeneCards: USP24
Enzyme activity
EC #	BRENDA	ExPASy	KEGG	MetaCyc
3.4.19.12	↗	↗	↗	↗

Gene location (Human)
Chr.	Chromosome 1 (human)
Band	1p32.3	Start	55,066,359 bp
Band	1p32.3	End	55,215,364 bp

Gene location (Mouse)
Chr.	Chromosome 4 (mouse)
Band	4|4 C7	Start	106,173,410 bp
Band	4|4 C7	End	106,298,519 bp
RNA expression pattern
Bgee	Human / Mouse (ortholog); Top expressed in: sural nerve; Skeletal muscle tissue of rectus abdominis; biceps brachii; Skeletal muscle tissue of biceps brachii; gastrocnemius muscle; muscle of thigh; subcutaneous adipose tissue; cerebellar hemisphere; right hemisphere of cerebellum; Achilles tendon / Top expressed in: temporal muscle; digastric muscle; sternocleidomastoid muscle; triceps brachii muscle; muscle of thigh; soleus muscle; ankle; quadriceps femoris muscle; Paneth cell; gastrocnemius muscle; More reference expression data
BioGPS	n/a
Gene ontology
Molecular function	peptidase activity; cysteine-type peptidase activity; hydrolase activity; thiol-dependent deubiquitinase; cysteine-type endopeptidase activity
Cellular component	nucleoplasm; cytoplasm
Biological process	ubiquitin-dependent protein catabolic process; proteolysis; protein deubiquitination
Sources:Amigo / QuickGO
Orthologs
Databases	NCBI: entry; OMA: entry
Species	Human	Mouse
Entrez	23358	329908
Ensembl	ENSG00000162402	ENSMUSG00000028514
UniProt	Q9UPU5	B1AY13
RefSeq (mRNA)	NM_015306	NM_183225
RefSeq (protein)	NP_056121	NP_899048
Location (UCSC)	Chr 1: 55.07 – 55.22 Mb	Chr 4: 106.17 – 106.3 Mb
PubMed search
- Wikidata
View/Edit Human	View/Edit Mouse

Ubiquitin carboxyl-terminal hydrolase 24 is an enzyme that in humans is encoded by the USP24 gene.
