= USP44 =

Protein-coding gene in the species Homo sapiens

Identifiers
- Aliases: USP44, ubiquitin specific peptidase 44
- External IDs: OMIM: 610993; MGI: 3045318; GeneCards: USP44
Enzyme activity
EC #	BRENDA	ExPASy	KEGG	MetaCyc
3.4.19.12	↗	↗	↗	↗

Gene location (Human)
Chr.	Chromosome 12 (human)
Band	12q22	Start	95,516,560 bp
Band	12q22	End	95,551,476 bp

Gene location (Mouse)
Chr.	Chromosome 10 (mouse)
Band	10|10 C2	Start	93,667,417 bp
Band	10|10 C2	End	93,693,950 bp
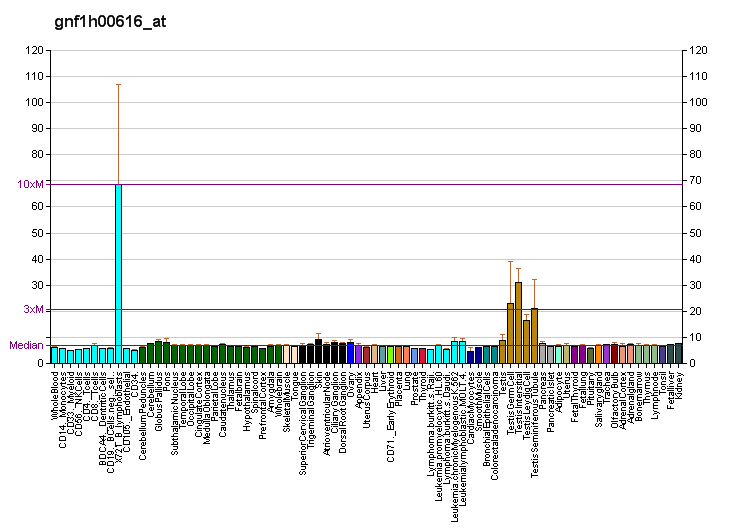
RNA expression pattern
Bgee	Human / Mouse (ortholog); Top expressed in: secondary oocyte; sperm; testicle; left testis; right testis; buccal mucosa cell; lower lobe of lung; cerebellar hemisphere; tibial nerve; right hemisphere of cerebellum / Top expressed in: spermatid; seminiferous tubule; spermatocyte; epiblast; tail of embryo; embryo; embryo; ventricular zone; primitive streak; thymus; More reference expression data
BioGPS	More reference expression data
Gene ontology
Molecular function	zinc ion binding; peptidase activity; cysteine-type peptidase activity; protein binding; hydrolase activity; metal ion binding; thiol-dependent deubiquitinase
Cellular component	nucleus; nucleoplasm; cytoplasm
Biological process	cell cycle; regulation of mitotic cell cycle spindle assembly checkpoint; ubiquitin-dependent protein catabolic process; proteasome-mediated ubiquitin-dependent protein catabolic process; proteolysis; cell division; negative regulation of ubiquitin protein ligase activity; protein deubiquitination; chromosome segregation
Sources:Amigo / QuickGO
Orthologs
Databases	NCBI: entry; OMA: entry
Species	Human	Mouse
Entrez	84101	327799
Ensembl	ENSG00000136014	ENSMUSG00000020020
UniProt	Q9H0E7	Q8C2S0
RefSeq (mRNA)	NM_001042403; NM_001278393; NM_032147; NM_001347936; NM_001347937	NM_001206851; NM_183199; NM_001376981; NM_001400981
RefSeq (protein)	NP_001035862; NP_001265322; NP_115523; NP_001334865; NP_001334866	NP_001193780; NP_001363910; NP_001387910
Location (UCSC)	Chr 12: 95.52 – 95.55 Mb	Chr 10: 93.67 – 93.69 Mb
PubMed search
- Wikidata
View/Edit Human	View/Edit Mouse

Ubiquitin carboxyl-terminal hydrolase 44 is an enzyme that in humans is encoded by the USP44 gene.
