= USP13 =

Protein-coding gene in the species Homo sapiens

Identifiers
- Aliases: USP13, ISOT3, IsoT-3, ubiquitin specific peptidase 13 (isopeptidase T-3), ubiquitin specific peptidase 13
- External IDs: OMIM: 603591; MGI: 1919857; GeneCards: USP13
Available structures
PDB	Ortholog search: PDBe RCSB
PDB	List of PDB id codes 2L80, 2LBC
Enzyme activity
EC #	BRENDA	ExPASy	KEGG	MetaCyc
3.4.19.12	↗	↗	↗	↗

Gene location (Human)
Chr.	Chromosome 3 (human)
Band	3q26.33	Start	179,653,032 bp
Band	3q26.33	End	179,804,366 bp

Gene location (Mouse)
Chr.	Chromosome 3 (mouse)
Band	3|3 A3	Start	32,871,695 bp
Band	3|3 A3	End	32,992,220 bp
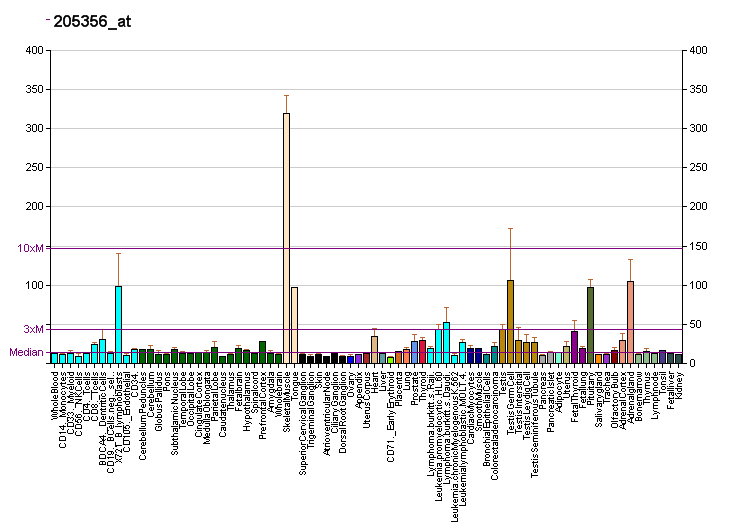
RNA expression pattern
Bgee	Human / Mouse (ortholog); Top expressed in: Skeletal muscle tissue of biceps brachii; glutes; thoracic diaphragm; deltoid muscle; vastus lateralis muscle; tibialis anterior muscle; triceps brachii muscle; Skeletal muscle tissue of rectus abdominis; right ventricle; myocardium of left ventricle / Top expressed in: interventricular septum; muscle of thigh; triceps brachii muscle; temporal muscle; sternocleidomastoid muscle; digastric muscle; soleus muscle; myocardium of ventricle; gastrocnemius muscle; skeletal muscle tissue; More reference expression data
BioGPS	More reference expression data
Gene ontology
Molecular function	cysteine-type peptidase activity; chaperone binding; zinc ion binding; BAT3 complex binding; metal ion binding; ubiquitin-like protein-specific protease activity; proteasome binding; peptidase activity; ubiquitin binding; protein binding; ubiquitin-like protein ligase binding; hydrolase activity; ubiquitin protein ligase binding; thiol-dependent deubiquitinase; cysteine-type endopeptidase activity
Cellular component	nucleoplasm; cytosol
Biological process	regulation of transcription, DNA-templated; ubiquitin-dependent protein catabolic process; positive regulation of ERAD pathway; proteolysis; autophagy; regulation of autophagy; protein K63-linked deubiquitination; maintenance of unfolded protein involved in ERAD pathway; cell population proliferation; melanocyte differentiation; protein deubiquitination; protein K29-linked deubiquitination; protein K6-linked deubiquitination; protein stabilization
Sources:Amigo / QuickGO
Orthologs
Databases	NCBI: entry; OMA: entry
Species	Human	Mouse
Entrez	8975	72607
Ensembl	ENSG00000058056	ENSMUSG00000056900
UniProt	Q92995	Q5BKP2
RefSeq (mRNA)	NM_003940	NM_001013024
RefSeq (protein)	NP_003931	NP_001013042
Location (UCSC)	Chr 3: 179.65 – 179.8 Mb	Chr 3: 32.87 – 32.99 Mb
PubMed search
- Wikidata
View/Edit Human	View/Edit Mouse

Ubiquitin carboxyl-terminal hydrolase 13 is an enzyme that in humans is encoded by the USP13 gene.
