= Zinc finger containing ubiquitin peptidase 1 =

Protein-coding gene in the species Homo sapiens

ZUP1

Identifiers
- Aliases: ZUP1, C6orf113, dJ412I7.3, zinc finger with UFM1 specific peptidase domain, zinc finger containing ubiquitin peptidase 1, ZUFSP
- External IDs: MGI: 1919830; GeneCards: ZUP1
Enzyme activity
EC #	BRENDA	ExPASy	KEGG	MetaCyc
3.4.19.12	↗	↗	↗	↗

Gene location (Human)
Chr.	Chromosome 6 (human)
Band	6q22.1	Start	116,635,618 bp
Band	6q22.1	End	116,668,794 bp

Gene location (Mouse)
Chr.	Chromosome 10 (mouse)
Band	10|10 B1	Start	33,795,138 bp
Band	10|10 B1	End	33,827,265 bp
RNA expression pattern
Bgee	Human / Mouse (ortholog); Top expressed in: secondary oocyte; gonad; testicle; monocyte; jejunal mucosa; duodenum; skin of abdomen; skin of leg; bone marrow; ganglionic eminence / Top expressed in: spermatocyte; secondary oocyte; primary oocyte; zygote; medial ganglionic eminence; granulocyte; lymph node; Paneth cell; spleen; spermatid; More reference expression data
BioGPS	n/a
Gene ontology
Molecular function	metal ion binding; protein binding; nucleic acid binding; thiol-dependent deubiquitinase; hydrolase activity
Cellular component	extracellular region; nucleus; cytoplasm
Biological process	negative regulation of endopeptidase activity; proteolysis
Sources:Amigo / QuickGO
Orthologs
Databases	NCBI: entry; OMA: entry
Species	Human	Mouse
Entrez	221302	72580
Ensembl	ENSG00000153975	ENSMUSG00000039531
UniProt	Q96AP4	Q3T9Z9
RefSeq (mRNA)	NM_145062	NM_028287; NM_001359455; NM_001359456
RefSeq (protein)	NP_659499; NP_001348118; NP_001348119; NP_001348120	NP_082563; NP_001346384; NP_001346385
Location (UCSC)	Chr 6: 116.64 – 116.67 Mb	Chr 10: 33.8 – 33.83 Mb
PubMed search
- Wikidata
View/Edit Human	View/Edit Mouse

Zinc finger containing ubiquitin peptidase 1 is a protein that in humans is encoded by the ZUP1 gene.
