= MINDY4 =

Protein-coding gene in the species Homo sapiens

Identifiers
- Aliases: MINDY4, C7orf67, FAM188B, family with sequence similarity 188 member B, MINDY lysine 48 deubiquitinase 4, AQP1, CHIP28, AQP-1
- External IDs: MGI: 3583959; HomoloGene: 49991; GeneCards: MINDY4; OMA:MINDY4 - orthologs

Gene location (Human)
Chr.	Chromosome 7 (human)
Band	7p14.3	Start	30,771,417 bp
Band	7p14.3	End	30,892,387 bp

Gene location (Mouse)
Chr.	Chromosome 6 (mouse)
Band	6|6 B3	Start	55,180,368 bp
Band	6|6 B3	End	55,297,207 bp
RNA expression pattern
Bgee	Human / Mouse (ortholog); Top expressed in: right uterine tube; testicle; right coronary artery; right ovary; left coronary artery; left ovary; right lung; upper lobe of left lung; ascending aorta; gonad / Top expressed in: molar; spermatocyte; spermatid; seminiferous tubule; primary oocyte; right kidney; proximal tubule; ventricular zone; lens; decidua; More reference expression data
BioGPS	n/a
Orthologs
Species	Human	Mouse
Entrez	84182	330323
Ensembl	ENSG00000106125	ENSMUSG00000038022
UniProt	Q4G0A6	Q3UQI9
RefSeq (mRNA)	NM_032222	NM_001142781; NM_177883
RefSeq (protein)	NP_115598	NP_001136253; NP_808551
Location (UCSC)	Chr 7: 30.77 – 30.89 Mb	Chr 6: 55.18 – 55.3 Mb
PubMed search
- Wikidata
View/Edit Human	View/Edit Mouse

MINDY lysine 48 deubiquitinase 4, also known as MINDY4, is a human gene.

== Predictions ==
The predicted molecular weight is 84,400 daltons and pI is 6.465. pTARGET predicts the cellular location to be in the golgi apparatus with 93.9% confidence.

== Expression ==
Based on the human tissue Gene Expression Omnibus profile, C7orf67 shows a marked increase in expression in the teratospermia disease state.
