= USP42 =

Protein-coding gene in the species Homo sapiens

Identifiers
- Aliases: USP42, ubiquitin specific peptidase 42
- External IDs: MGI: 1924050; GeneCards: USP42
Enzyme activity
EC #	BRENDA	ExPASy	KEGG	MetaCyc
3.4.19.12	↗	↗	↗	↗

Gene location (Human)
Chr.	Chromosome 7 (human)
Band	7p22.1	Start	6,104,949 bp
Band	7p22.1	End	6,161,564 bp

Gene location (Mouse)
Chr.	Chromosome 5 (mouse)
Band	5 G2|5 82.5 cM	Start	143,696,080 bp
Band	5 G2|5 82.5 cM	End	143,718,035 bp
RNA expression pattern
Bgee	Human / Mouse (ortholog); Top expressed in: sperm; pancreatic epithelial cell; mucosa of ileum; pancreatic ductal cell; testicle; Brodmann area 23; tibialis anterior muscle; nipple; cartilage tissue; postcentral gyrus / Top expressed in: cumulus cell; vas deferens; utricle; tail of embryo; seminiferous tubule; abdominal wall; maxillary prominence; genital tubercle; mandibular prominence; foot; More reference expression data
BioGPS	n/a
Gene ontology
Molecular function	cysteine-type peptidase activity; protein binding; peptidase activity; hydrolase activity; thiol-dependent deubiquitinase; cysteine-type endopeptidase activity
Cellular component	nucleoplasm
Biological process	ubiquitin-dependent protein catabolic process; spermatogenesis; proteolysis; cell differentiation; protein deubiquitination; regulation of apoptotic process
Sources:Amigo / QuickGO
Orthologs
Databases	NCBI: entry; OMA: entry
Species	Human	Mouse
Entrez	84132	76800
Ensembl	ENSG00000106346	ENSMUSG00000051306
UniProt	Q9H9J4	B2RQC2
RefSeq (mRNA)	NM_032172; NM_001365764; NM_001389650	NM_029749
RefSeq (protein)	NP_115548; NP_001352693	NP_084025
Location (UCSC)	Chr 7: 6.1 – 6.16 Mb	Chr 5: 143.7 – 143.72 Mb
PubMed search
- Wikidata
View/Edit Human	View/Edit Mouse

Ubiquitin carboxyl-terminal hydrolase 42 is an enzyme that in humans is encoded by the USP42 gene.
