= USP39 =

Protein-coding gene in the species Homo sapiens

Identifiers
- Aliases: USP39, 65K, HSPC332, SAD1, SNRNP65, CGI-21, ubiquitin specific peptidase 39
- External IDs: OMIM: 611594; MGI: 107622; GeneCards: USP39
Available structures
PDB	Ortholog search: PDBe RCSB
PDB	List of PDB id codes 3JCR
Enzyme activity
EC #	BRENDA	ExPASy	KEGG	MetaCyc
3.4.19.12	↗	↗	↗	↗

Gene location (Human)
Chr.	Chromosome 2 (human)
Band	2p11.2	Start	85,602,856 bp
Band	2p11.2	End	85,649,283 bp

Gene location (Mouse)
Chr.	Chromosome 6 (mouse)
Band	6 C1|6 32.27 cM	Start	72,295,661 bp
Band	6 C1|6 32.27 cM	End	72,322,167 bp
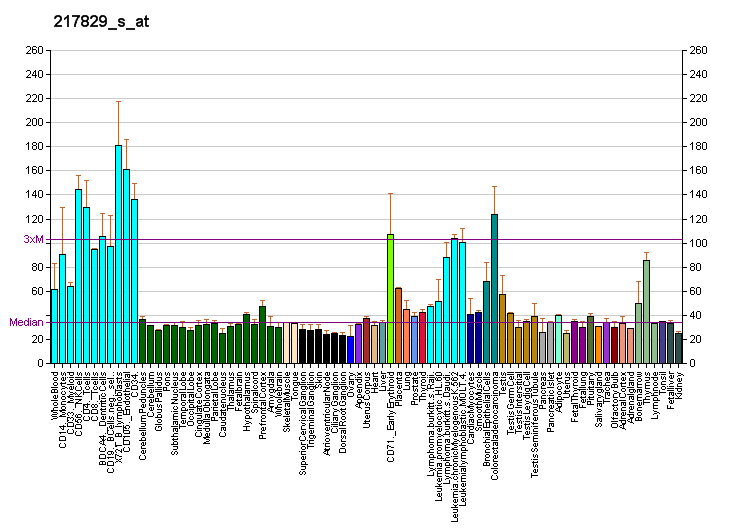
RNA expression pattern
Bgee	Human / Mouse (ortholog); Top expressed in: ventricular zone; ganglionic eminence; gastrocnemius muscle; granulocyte; muscle of thigh; monocyte; stromal cell of endometrium; muscle layer of sigmoid colon; upper lobe of left lung; right lung / Top expressed in: epiblast; ventricular zone; tail of embryo; spermatocyte; placenta; yolk sac; granulocyte; ganglionic eminence; genital tubercle; bone marrow; More reference expression data
BioGPS	More reference expression data
Gene ontology
Molecular function	thiol-dependent deubiquitinase; zinc ion binding; metal ion binding; protein binding
Cellular component	spliceosomal complex; nucleus; nucleoplasm; U4/U6 x U5 tri-snRNP complex
Biological process	protein deubiquitination; mRNA splicing, via spliceosome; cell cycle; mRNA processing; RNA splicing; cell division; spliceosomal complex assembly
Sources:Amigo / QuickGO
Orthologs
Databases	NCBI: entry; OMA: entry
Species	Human	Mouse
Entrez	10713	28035
Ensembl	ENSG00000168883	ENSMUSG00000056305
UniProt	Q53GS9	Q3TIX9
RefSeq (mRNA)	NM_001256725; NM_001256726; NM_001256727; NM_001256728; NM_006590	NM_138592
RefSeq (protein)	NP_001243654; NP_001243655; NP_001243656; NP_001243657; NP_006581	NP_613058
Location (UCSC)	Chr 2: 85.6 – 85.65 Mb	Chr 6: 72.3 – 72.32 Mb
PubMed search
- Wikidata
View/Edit Human	View/Edit Mouse

U4/U6.U5 tri-snRNP-associated protein 2 is a protein that in humans is encoded by the USP39 gene.
