= USP40 =

Protein-coding gene in the species Homo sapiens

Identifiers
- Aliases: USP40, ubiquitin specific peptidase 40
- External IDs: OMIM: 610570; MGI: 2443184; GeneCards: USP40
Enzyme activity
EC #	BRENDA	ExPASy	KEGG	MetaCyc
3.4.19.12	↗	↗	↗	↗

Gene location (Human)
Chr.	Chromosome 2 (human)
Band	2q37.1	Start	233,475,520 bp
Band	2q37.1	End	233,566,782 bp

Gene location (Mouse)
Chr.	Chromosome 1 (mouse)
Band	1|1 D	Start	87,945,119 bp
Band	1|1 D	End	88,008,551 bp
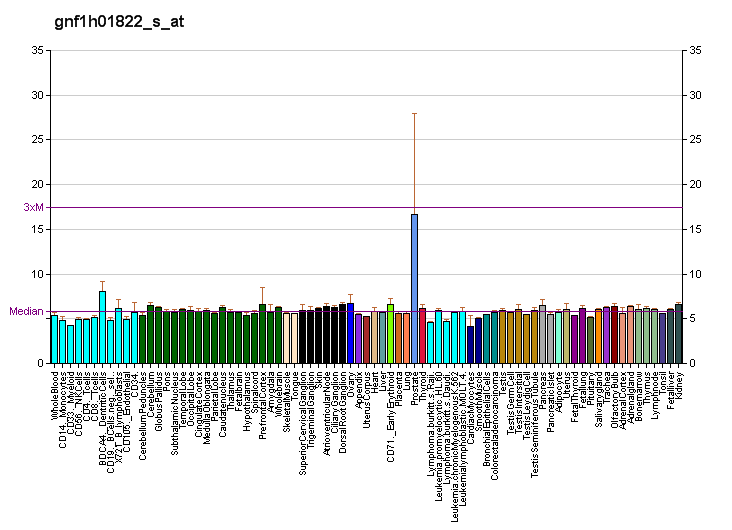
RNA expression pattern
Bgee	Human / Mouse (ortholog); Top expressed in: right lobe of thyroid gland; left lobe of thyroid gland; right uterine tube; right adrenal cortex; Achilles tendon; C1 segment; sural nerve; left ovary; skin of abdomen; left adrenal gland / Top expressed in: hand; genital tubercle; tail of embryo; ventricular zone; spermatocyte; lens; Rostral migratory stream; fossa; condyle; transitional epithelium of urinary bladder; More reference expression data
BioGPS	More reference expression data
Gene ontology
Molecular function	thiol-dependent deubiquitinase; peptidase activity; cysteine-type peptidase activity; hydrolase activity; cysteine-type endopeptidase activity
Cellular component	cytoplasm; nucleus; cytosol
Biological process	protein deubiquitination; ubiquitin-dependent protein catabolic process; proteolysis; regulation of protein stability
Sources:Amigo / QuickGO
Orthologs
Databases	NCBI: entry; OMA: entry
Species	Human	Mouse
Entrez	55230	227334
Ensembl	ENSG00000085982	ENSMUSG00000005501
UniProt	Q9NVE5	Q8BWR4
RefSeq (mRNA)	NM_018218; NM_001365479	NM_001033291; NM_001198573
RefSeq (protein)	NP_060688; NP_001352408; NP_001369224; NP_001369225; NP_001369226 NP_001369227; NP_001369228; NP_001369229; NP_001369230; NP_001369231; NP_001369232	NP_001028463; NP_001185502
Location (UCSC)	Chr 2: 233.48 – 233.57 Mb	Chr 1: 87.95 – 88.01 Mb
PubMed search
- Wikidata
View/Edit Human	View/Edit Mouse

Ubiquitin carboxyl-terminal hydrolase 40 is an enzyme that in humans is encoded by the USP40 gene.
