= USP2 =

Protein-coding gene in the species Homo sapiens

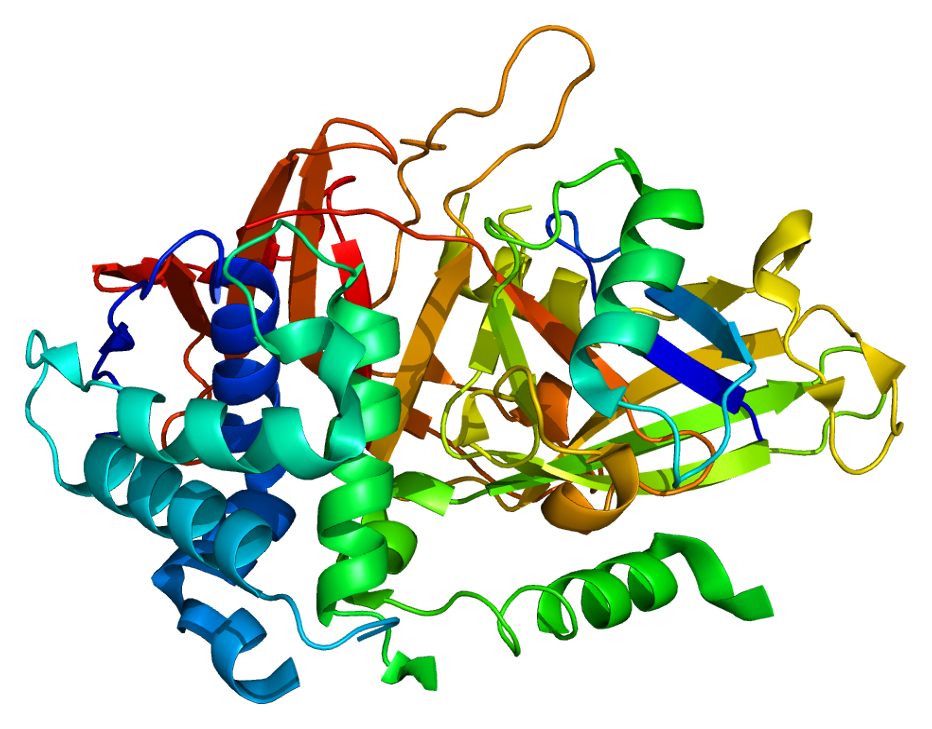

Identifiers
- Aliases: USP2, UBP41, USP9, ubiquitin specific peptidase 2
- External IDs: OMIM: 604725; MGI: 1858178; GeneCards: USP2
Available structures
PDB	Ortholog search: PDBe RCSB
PDB	List of PDB id codes 2HD5, 2IBI, 3NHE, 3V6C, 3V6E
Enzyme activity
EC #	BRENDA	ExPASy	KEGG	MetaCyc
3.4.19.12	↗	↗	↗	↗

Gene location (Human)
Chr.	Chromosome 11 (human)
Band	11q23.3	Start	119,355,215 bp
Band	11q23.3	End	119,381,711 bp

Gene location (Mouse)
Chr.	Chromosome 9 (mouse)
Band	9|9 A5.1	Start	44,067,021 bp
Band	9|9 A5.1	End	44,095,627 bp
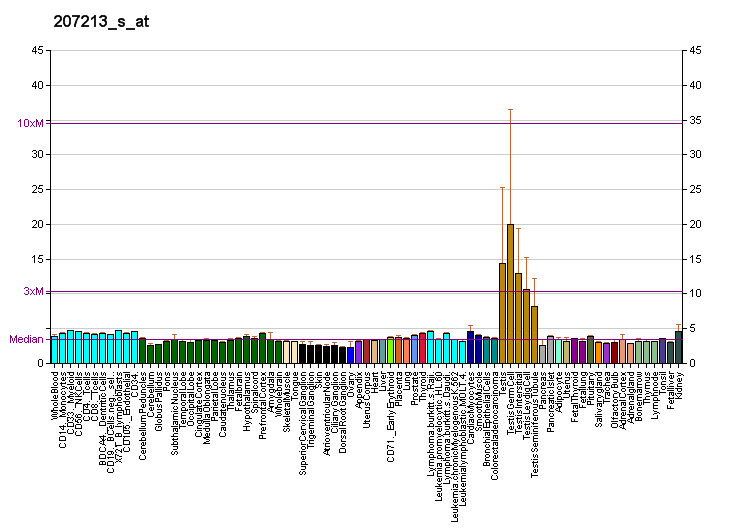
RNA expression pattern
Bgee	Human / Mouse (ortholog); Top expressed in: muscle of thigh; gastrocnemius muscle; left testis; sperm; apex of heart; right testis; secondary oocyte; Skeletal muscle tissue of rectus abdominis; left ventricle; right auricle of heart / Top expressed in: seminiferous tubule; plantaris muscle; muscle of thigh; extensor digitorum longus muscle; skeletal muscle tissue; vestibular membrane of cochlear duct; neural layer of retina; gastrocnemius muscle; ankle; soleus muscle; More reference expression data
BioGPS	More reference expression data
Gene ontology
Molecular function	cysteine-type peptidase activity; metal ion binding; peptidase activity; protein binding; identical protein binding; cysteine-type endopeptidase activity; hydrolase activity; ubiquitin protein ligase binding; cyclin binding; thiol-dependent deubiquitinase
Cellular component	cytoplasm; centrosome; cell cortex; perinuclear region of cytoplasm; nucleus; nucleoplasm; membrane
Biological process	ubiquitin-dependent protein catabolic process; rhythmic process; muscle organ development; protein stabilization; positive regulation of mitotic cell cycle; negative regulation of transcription by RNA polymerase II; circadian regulation of gene expression; proteolysis; circadian behavior; cell cycle; entrainment of circadian clock by photoperiod; locomotor rhythm; protein deubiquitination
Sources:Amigo / QuickGO
Orthologs
Databases	NCBI: entry; OMA: entry
Species	Human	Mouse
Entrez	9099	53376
Ensembl	ENSG00000036672	ENSMUSG00000032010
UniProt	O75604	O88623
RefSeq (mRNA)	NM_001243759; NM_004205; NM_171997	NM_016808; NM_198091; NM_198092
RefSeq (protein)	NP_001230688; NP_004196; NP_741994	NP_058088; NP_932759; NP_932760; NP_001394747; NP_001394748 NP_001394749; NP_001394750; NP_001394751; NP_001394752; NP_001394753; NP_001394754; NP_001394755; NP_001394756
Location (UCSC)	Chr 11: 119.36 – 119.38 Mb	Chr 9: 44.07 – 44.1 Mb
PubMed search
- Wikidata
View/Edit Human	View/Edit Mouse

Ubiquitin carboxyl-terminal hydrolase 2 is an enzyme that in humans is encoded by the USP2 gene.

Ubiquitin (MIM 191339), a highly conserved protein involved in the regulation of intracellular protein breakdown, cell cycle regulation, and stress response, is released from degraded proteins by disassembly of the polyubiquitin chains. The disassembly process is mediated by ubiquitin-specific proteases (USPs). Also see USP1 (MIM 603478).[supplied by OMIM]
