= USP1 =

Protein-coding gene in humans

Identifiers
- Aliases: USP1, UBP, ubiquitin specific peptidase 1
- External IDs: OMIM: 603478; MGI: 2385198; GeneCards: USP1
Enzyme activity
EC #	BRENDA	ExPASy	KEGG	MetaCyc
3.4.19.12	↗	↗	↗	↗

Gene location (Human)
Chr.	Chromosome 1 (human)
Band	1p31.3	Start	62,436,297 bp
Band	1p31.3	End	62,451,804 bp

Gene location (Mouse)
Chr.	Chromosome 4 (mouse)
Band	4|4 C6	Start	98,812,047 bp
Band	4|4 C6	End	98,823,780 bp
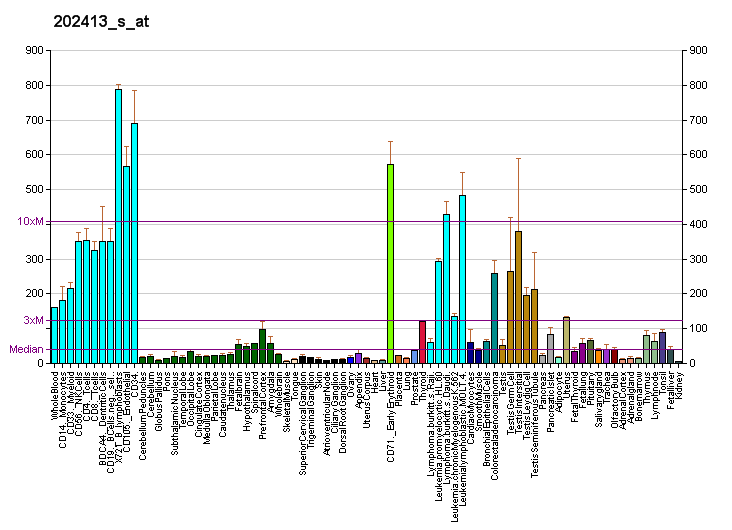

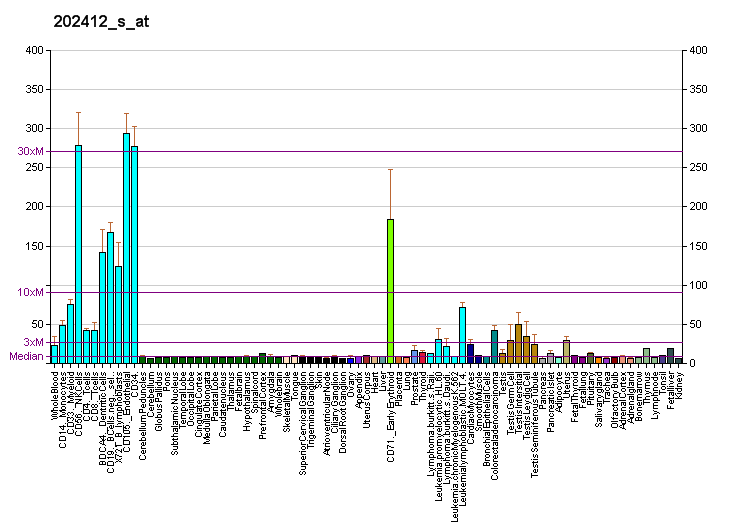
RNA expression pattern
Bgee	Human / Mouse (ortholog); Top expressed in: secondary oocyte; ventricular zone; sperm; trabecular bone; ganglionic eminence; gonad; endothelial cell; germinal epithelium; cartilage tissue; tibia / Top expressed in: seminiferous tubule; gastrula; primitive streak; spermatid; spermatocyte; vas deferens; mandibular prominence; abdominal wall; ureter; maxillary prominence; More reference expression data
BioGPS	More reference expression data
Gene ontology
Molecular function	cysteine-type peptidase activity; protein binding; hydrolase activity; thiol-dependent deubiquitinase; cysteine-type endopeptidase activity; peptidase activity
Cellular component	nucleus; nucleoplasm
Biological process	skeletal system development; monoubiquitinated protein deubiquitination; response to UV; ubiquitin-dependent protein catabolic process; proteolysis; cellular response to DNA damage stimulus; protein deubiquitination; DNA repair; regulation of DNA repair; interstrand cross-link repair
Sources:Amigo / QuickGO
Orthologs
Databases	NCBI: entry; OMA: entry
Species	Human	Mouse
Entrez	7398	230484
Ensembl	ENSG00000162607	ENSMUSG00000028560
UniProt	O94782	Q8BJQ2
RefSeq (mRNA)	NM_003368; NM_001017415; NM_001017416	NM_001301414; NM_146144; NM_001356424
RefSeq (protein)	NP_001017415; NP_001017416; NP_003359	NP_001288343; NP_666256; NP_001343353
Location (UCSC)	Chr 1: 62.44 – 62.45 Mb	Chr 4: 98.81 – 98.82 Mb
PubMed search
- Wikidata
View/Edit Human	View/Edit Mouse

Ubiquitin carboxyl-terminal hydrolase 1 is an enzyme that in humans is encoded by the USP1 gene.

== Gene ==
The protein specifically deubiquitinates a protein in the Fanconi anemia (FA) DNA repair pathway. Alternate transcriptional splice variants have been characterized.

== Function ==
This gene encodes a member of the ubiquitin-specific processing (UBP) family of proteases that is a deubiquitinating enzyme (DUB) with His and Cys domains. This protein is located in the cytoplasm and cleaves the ubiquitin moiety from ubiquitin-fused precursors and ubiquitinylated proteins.

The protein specifically deubiquitinates a protein in the Fanconi anemia (FA) DNA repair pathway.

== Research ==
UCH-L1 has been studied, in a 2020 paper by Sharma, et al for its association with neurodegenerative diseases (Parkinson's disease)

A 2024 paper by Li, et al indicates possible contribution to cancer progression. Apparently via stabilizing proteins that promote cell proliferation (in TNBC, UCHL1 deubiquitinates and stabilizes KLF5, as a consequence there is resistance to endocrine therapy).
