= MINDY3 =

Protein-coding gene in the species Homo sapiens

Identifiers
- Aliases: MINDY3, C10orf97, CARP, DERP5, MST126, my042, MSTP126, FAM188A, Fam188a, family with sequence similarity 188 member A, MINDY lysine 48 deubiquitinase 3
- External IDs: OMIM: 611649; MGI: 1914210; HomoloGene: 11478; GeneCards: MINDY3; OMA:MINDY3 - orthologs

Gene location (Human)
Chr.	Chromosome 10 (human)
Band	10p13	Start	15,778,170 bp
Band	10p13	End	15,860,507 bp

Gene location (Mouse)
Chr.	Chromosome 2 (mouse)
Band	n/a	Start	12,347,263 bp
Band	n/a	End	12,419,470 bp
RNA expression pattern
Bgee	Human / Mouse (ortholog); Top expressed in: gastric mucosa; Achilles tendon; canal of the cervix; pons; tibial arteries; C1 segment; rectum; right coronary artery; right ovary; spinal ganglia / Top expressed in: interventricular septum; zygote; spinal ganglia; lumbar spinal ganglion; secondary oocyte; umbilical cord; trigeminal ganglion; tail of embryo; primary oocyte; dentate gyrus; More reference expression data
BioGPS	n/a
Gene ontology
Molecular function	protein binding; cysteine-type carboxypeptidase activity; thiol-dependent deubiquitinase; Lys48-specific deubiquitinase activity; peptidase activity; cysteine-type peptidase activity; hydrolase activity
Cellular component	nuclear membrane; nucleus; nucleoplasm
Biological process	apoptotic process; protein K48-linked deubiquitination; proteolysis
Sources:Amigo / QuickGO
Orthologs
Species	Human	Mouse
Entrez	80013	66960
Ensembl	ENSG00000148481	ENSMUSG00000026767
UniProt	Q9H8M7	Q9CV28
RefSeq (mRNA)	NM_024948; NM_001318330	NM_024185
RefSeq (protein)	NP_001305259; NP_079224	NP_077147; NP_001342464; NP_001342465; NP_001342466; NP_001342467 NP_001342468
Location (UCSC)	Chr 10: 15.78 – 15.86 Mb	Chr 2: 12.35 – 12.42 Mb
PubMed search
- Wikidata
View/Edit Human	View/Edit Mouse

Ubiquitin carboxyl-terminal hydrolase MINDY-3 is a protein which in humans is encoded by the MINDY3 gene located on chromosome 10p13.. MINDY3 is also known as Dermal papilla derived protein (DERP5), C10orf97, FAM188A, and brain my042 protein. MINDY3 and its paralogs in other species are all members of the DUF4205 superfamily of protein domains. Fam188a is a highly conserved gene found in all vertebrates. MINDY3 is a gene expressed throughout the body.

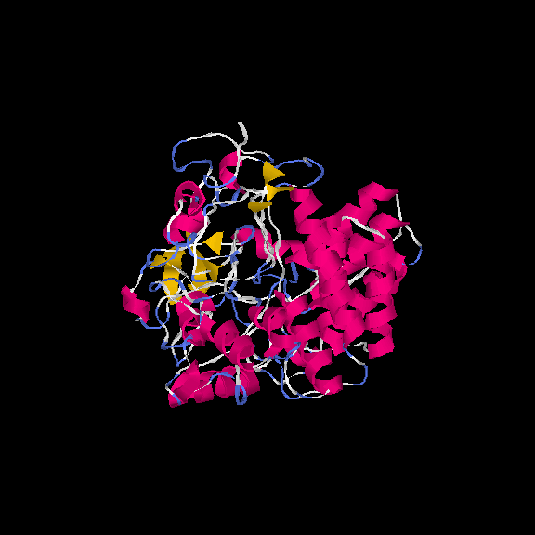
Predicted protein structure of Fam188a using I-TASSER

== Homology ==
All mammalian species compared share a 95-99% homology similarity to Homo sapiens MINDY3. The reasons behind this are unknown, but it can be inferred that MINDY3 must play an important role in proper cellular function in mammals, as even small changes over time in important genes can drastically alter their function.

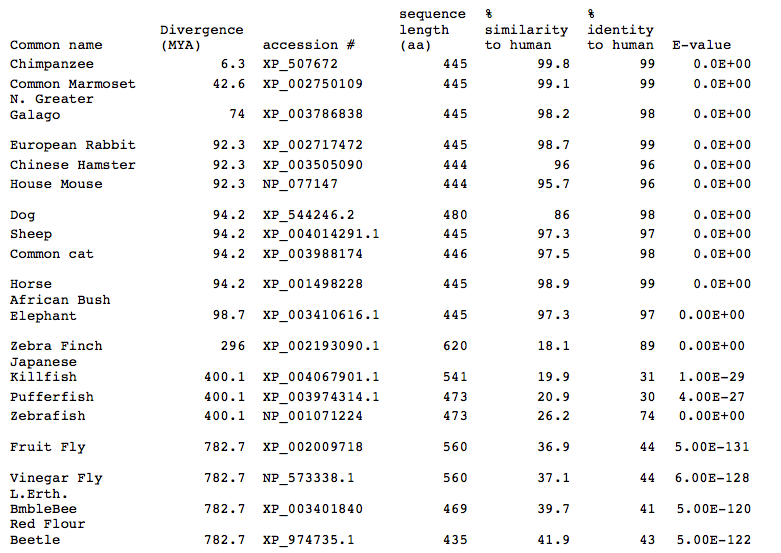
Evolutionary comparison of different species' Fam188a

Avians, Fish, and Insects also shared a similarity in the 30-40% range with Homo sapiens' MINDY3. Even though there are several hundred million years of divergence from Humans and insects, the fact that there is still a 40% similarity in insects seems to suggest that this gene hasn't changed extremely over such long timespans, and must have been important for other species as well long ago. The splice patterns in these other species aren't known, but in humans there are at least 19 different isoforms but with only 1 major paralog: Fam188b. This paralog differs structurally in 3 exons with MINDY3.

An evolutionary tree between various species that have homologs of Fam188a.

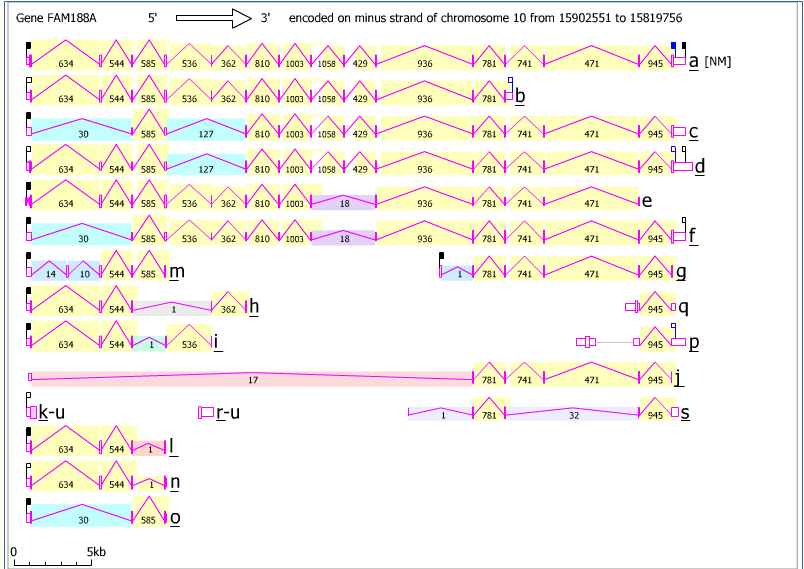
Intron/exon map of Fam188a in Homo sapiens

== Protein ==
MINDY3 is a 445-Amino Acid chain. Structurally, it doesn't show many interesting regions that could easily set it apart from other proteins. MINDY3 has no transmembrane domains, it has no sequence repeats.

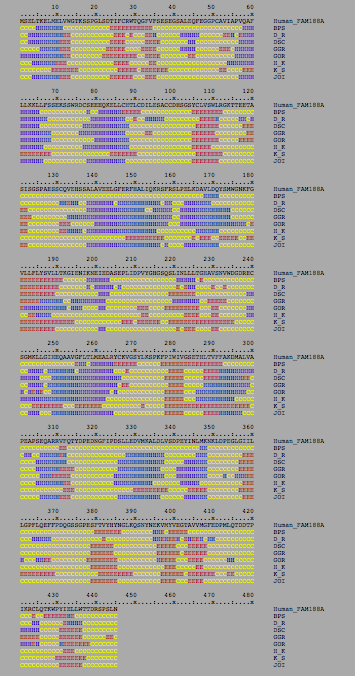
Fam188a post-translational predicted protein secondary structure

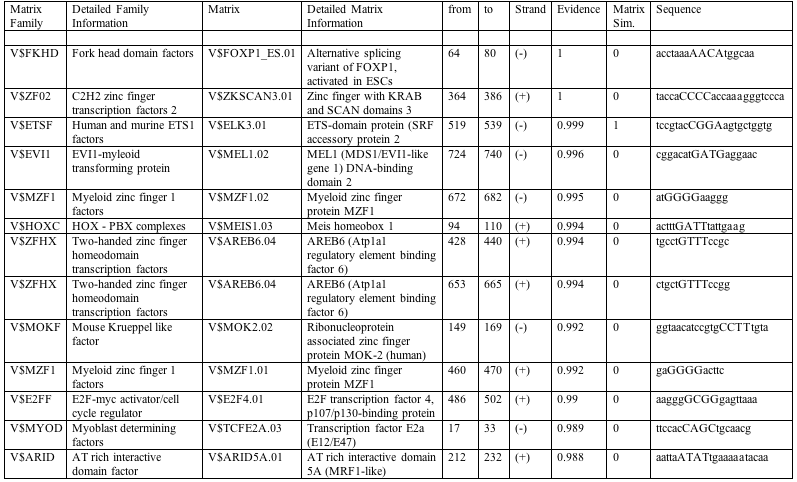
Fam188a predicted transcription factor binding sites

== Function and interacting proteins ==
The I-TASSER protein folding results show that MINDY3's protein product has a similar structure to 1CFF, a Calmodulin binding peptide. Calmodulin is involved in cell apoptosis as well, so this can shed light on the theorized function of MINDY3 as well.

The protein fold is most functionally similar to 3LEW, a “SusD-like carbohydrate binding protein from Bacteroides vulgatus” (Joint Center for Structural Genomics). 3LEW shares a 90% similarity with MINDY3, and although not enough to make a concrete connection, it is enough to establish a base idea of related structures. Another protein that is functionally similar (81%) is 3SNX, a “putative SusD-like carbohydrate binding protein from Bacteroides thetaiotaomicron VPI-5482”. The function of MINDY3 can be assumed to play a role in cell apoptosis, and that is because it shares structural similarities with other proteins that are involved in this process. Although there is no CARD-domain as would normally be found in an apoptotic peptide, MINDY3 does share a similar function with 1cffA, a “calmodulin binding peptide of the Ca2+ pump”. Since Calmodulin is known to cause apoptosis throughout various body tissues via the Ca2+ pump and 1cffA shares a 26% similarity with MINDY3, I can hypothesize that apoptosis truly is the function of MINDY3. Other molecules similar to MINDY3 are 1linA, and 1qx7M, which share 23% and 18% structure similarity respectively, and both of these molecules deal with either the Ca2+ pump or Calmodulin expression as well.

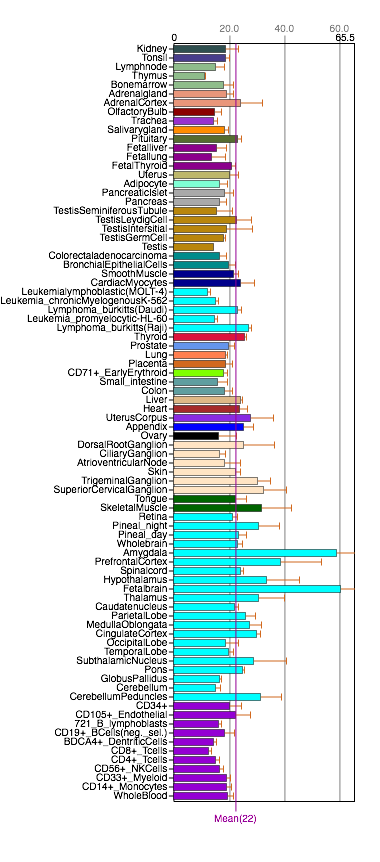
Fam188a tissue expression throughout various body tissues

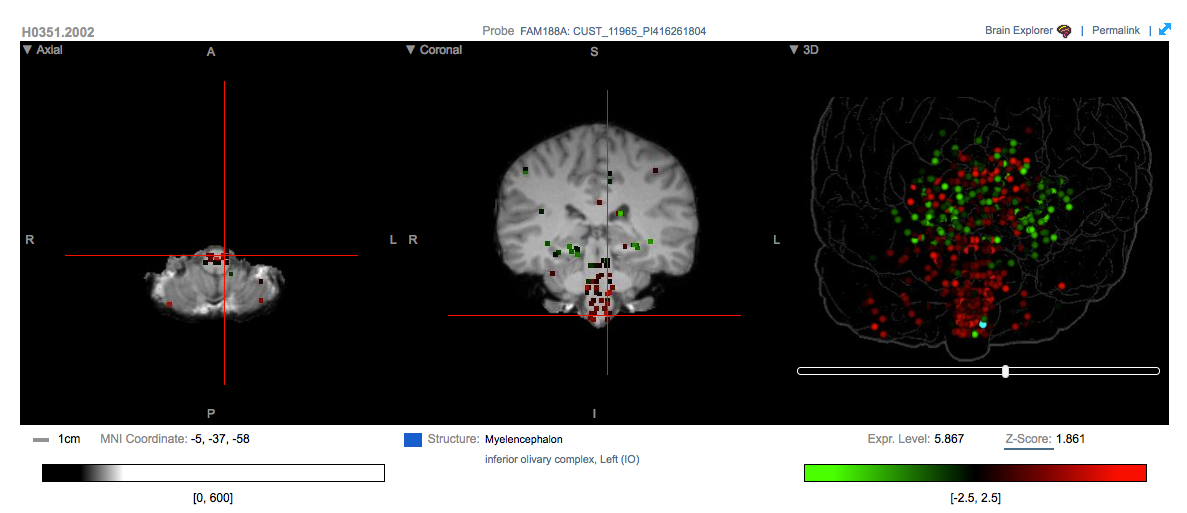
Expression locations of Fam188a in the human brain

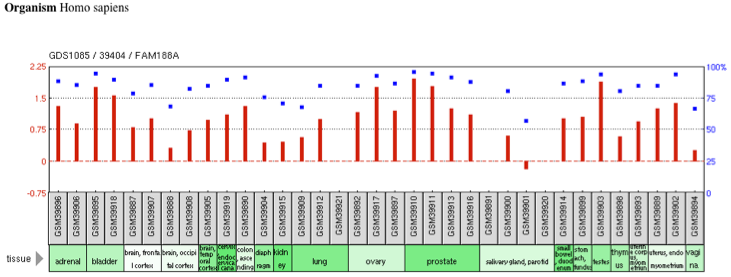
