= OTUB1 =

Protein-coding gene in the species Homo sapiens

Identifiers
- Aliases: OTUB1, OTB1, OTU1, HSPC263, OTU deubiquitinase, ubiquitin aldehyde binding 1
- External IDs: OMIM: 608337; MGI: 2147616; GeneCards: OTUB1
Available structures
| PDB | Ortholog search: PDBe RCSB |
| PDB | List of PDB id codes 2ZFY, 3VON, 4DDG, 4DDI, 4DHZ, 4I6L, 4LDT |
Enzyme activity
| EC # | BRENDA | ExPASy | KEGG | MetaCyc |
|---|---|---|---|---|
| 3.4.19.12 | ↗ | ↗ | ↗ | ↗ |

Gene location (Human)
| Chr. | Chromosome 11 (human) |
| Band | 11q13.1 | Start | 63,985,853 bp |
| Band | 11q13.1 | End | 64,001,811 bp |

Gene location (Mouse)
| Chr. | Chromosome 19 (mouse) |
| Band | 19|19 A | Start | 7,175,567 bp |
| Band | 19|19 A | End | 7,183,681 bp |
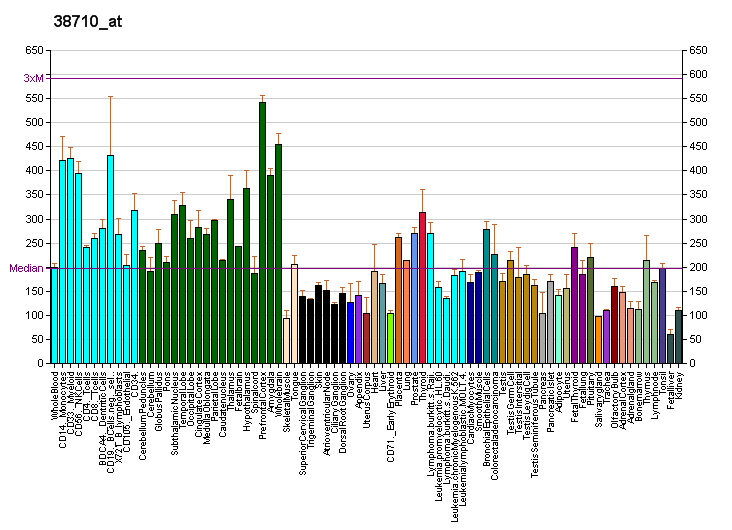

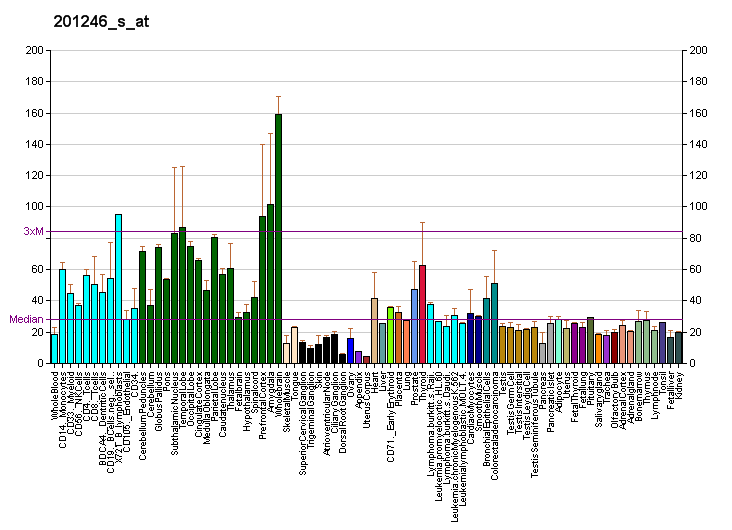

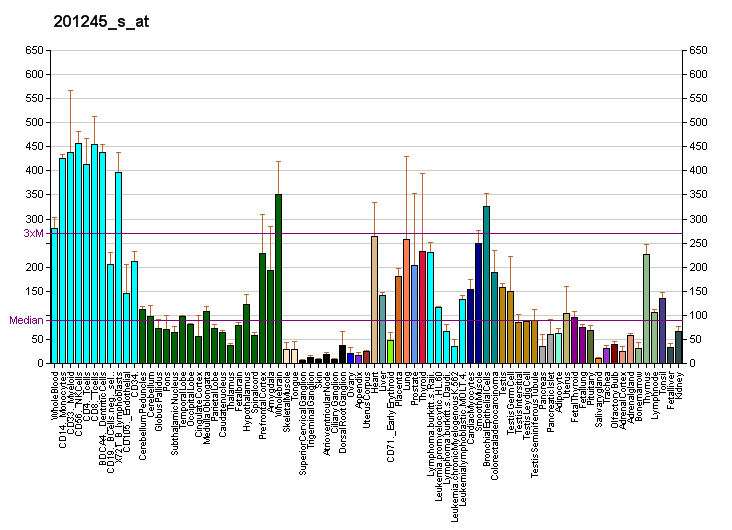
RNA expression pattern
| Bgee | Human / Mouse (ortholog); Top expressed in: right frontal lobe; prefrontal cortex; right hemisphere of cerebellum; Brodmann area 10; cingulate gyrus; anterior cingulate cortex; granulocyte; pancreatic ductal cell; mucosa of ileum; Brodmann area 9 / Top expressed in: dentate gyrus of hippocampal formation granule cell; superior frontal gyrus; yolk sac; ventricular zone; neural layer of retina; morula; tail of embryo; lip; primary visual cortex; spermatocyte; More reference expression data |
| BioGPS | More reference expression data |
Gene ontology
| Molecular function | cysteine-type peptidase activity; NEDD8-specific protease activity; thiol-dependent deubiquitinase; peptidase activity; ubiquitin binding; protein binding; hydrolase activity; ubiquitin protein ligase binding |
| Cellular component | cytoplasm; extracellular exosome; nucleus; nucleoplasm; cytosol |
| Biological process | adaptive immune response; protein K48-linked deubiquitination; immune system process; proteolysis; cellular response to DNA damage stimulus; negative regulation of double-strand break repair; negative regulation of histone H2A K63-linked ubiquitination; cellular response to interleukin-1; DNA repair; protein deubiquitination |
Sources:Amigo / QuickGO
Orthologs
| Databases | NCBI: entry; OMA: entry |
| Species | Human | Mouse |
| Entrez | 55611 | 107260 |
| Ensembl | ENSG00000167770 | ENSMUSG00000024767 |
| UniProt | Q96FW1 | Q7TQI3 |
| RefSeq (mRNA) | NM_017670 | NM_134150 |
| RefSeq (protein) | NP_060140 | NP_598911 |
| Location (UCSC) | Chr 11: 63.99 – 64 Mb | Chr 19: 7.18 – 7.18 Mb |
| PubMed search |
- Wikidata
| View/Edit Human | View/Edit Mouse |

Ubiquitin thioesterase OTUB1 also known as otubain-1 is an enzyme that in humans is encoded by the OTUB1 gene. Alternative splicing results in multiple transcript variants.

== Function ==
Otubain-1 is a member of the OTU (ovarian tumor) superfamily of predicted cysteine proteases. The encoded protein is a highly specific ubiquitin iso-peptidase, and cleaves ubiquitin from branched poly-ubiquitin chains, being specific for lysine^{48} -linked polyubiquitin but not lysine^{63} -linked polyubiquitin. It interacts with another ubiquitin protease and an E3 ubiquitin ligase that inhibits cytokine gene transcription in the immune system. It is proposed to function in specific ubiquitin-dependent pathways, possibly by providing an editing function for polyubiquitin chain growth.

== Interactions ==
OTUB1 has been shown to interact with RNF128 and GNB2L1.
