= USP19 =

Protein-coding gene in the species Homo sapiens

Identifiers
- Aliases: USP19, ZMYND9, ubiquitin specific peptidase 19
- External IDs: OMIM: 614471; MGI: 1918722; GeneCards: USP19
Available structures
PDB	Ortholog search: PDBe RCSB
PDB	List of PDB id codes 1WH0, 4X3G
Enzyme activity
EC #	BRENDA	ExPASy	KEGG	MetaCyc
3.4.19.12	↗	↗	↗	↗

Gene location (Human)
Chr.	Chromosome 3 (human)
Band	3p21.31	Start	49,108,046 bp
Band	3p21.31	End	49,120,938 bp

Gene location (Mouse)
Chr.	Chromosome 9 (mouse)
Band	9|9 F2	Start	108,367,801 bp
Band	9|9 F2	End	108,379,536 bp
RNA expression pattern
Bgee	Human / Mouse (ortholog); Top expressed in: gastrocnemius muscle; muscle of thigh; right uterine tube; right lobe of thyroid gland; right adrenal cortex; granulocyte; apex of heart; body of tongue; right hemisphere of cerebellum; left adrenal gland / Top expressed in: secondary oocyte; primary oocyte; zygote; neural layer of retina; muscle of thigh; choroid plexus of fourth ventricle; superior frontal gyrus; granulocyte; lip; ventricular zone; More reference expression data
BioGPS	n/a
Gene ontology
Molecular function	Hsp90 protein binding; cysteine-type peptidase activity; metal ion binding; Lys48-specific deubiquitinase activity; peptidase activity; protein binding; thiol-dependent deubiquitinase; hydrolase activity; ubiquitin protein ligase binding
Cellular component	integral component of membrane; endoplasmic reticulum membrane; membrane; endoplasmic reticulum; cytosol; nucleus
Biological process	protein K48-linked deubiquitination; regulation of protein stability; ubiquitin-dependent protein catabolic process; protein stabilization; response to endoplasmic reticulum stress; proteolysis; regulation of ERAD pathway; regulation of cellular response to hypoxia; negative regulation of skeletal muscle tissue development; positive regulation of cell cycle process; ubiquitin-dependent ERAD pathway; negative regulation of proteasomal protein catabolic process; protein deubiquitination
Sources:Amigo / QuickGO
Orthologs
Databases	NCBI: entry; OMA: entry
Species	Human	Mouse
Entrez	10869	71472
Ensembl	ENSG00000172046	ENSMUSG00000006676
UniProt	O94966	Q3UJD6
RefSeq (mRNA)	NM_001199160; NM_001199161; NM_001199162; NM_006677; NM_001351098 NM_001351099; NM_001351100; NM_001351101; NM_001351102; NM_001351103; NM_001351104; NM_001351105; NM_001351106; NM_001351107; NM_001351108; NM_001389594; NM_001389595; NM_001389596; NM_001389597; NM_001389598; NM_001389599; NM_001389600; NM_001389601; NM_001389602; NM_001389603; NM_001389604; NM_001389605; NM_001389606; NM_001389607; NM_001389608; NM_001400288; NM_001400290; NM_001400292; NM_001400293; NM_001400294; NM_001400295; NM_001400296; NM_001400297; NM_001400298; NM_001400299	NM_001168371; NM_001168372; NM_001168373; NM_027804; NM_145407
RefSeq (protein)	NP_001186089; NP_001186090; NP_001186091; NP_006668; NP_001338027 NP_001338028; NP_001338029; NP_001338030; NP_001338031; NP_001338032; NP_001338033; NP_001338034; NP_001338035; NP_001338036; NP_001338037	NP_001161843; NP_001161844; NP_001161845; NP_082080; NP_663382
Location (UCSC)	Chr 3: 49.11 – 49.12 Mb	Chr 9: 108.37 – 108.38 Mb
PubMed search
- Wikidata
View/Edit Human	View/Edit Mouse

Ubiquitin specific peptidase 19 is a protein that in humans is encoded by the USP19 gene.
