= USP4 =

Protein-coding gene in the species Homo sapiens

Identifiers
- Aliases: USP4, UNP, Unph, ubiquitin specific peptidase 4
- External IDs: OMIM: 603486; MGI: 98905; GeneCards: USP4
Available structures
PDB	Ortholog search: PDBe RCSB
PDB	List of PDB id codes 2Y6E, 5CTR
Enzyme activity
EC #	BRENDA	ExPASy	KEGG	MetaCyc
3.4.19.12	↗	↗	↗	↗

Gene location (Human)
Chr.	Chromosome 3 (human)
Band	3p21.31	Start	49,277,144 bp
Band	3p21.31	End	49,340,712 bp

Gene location (Mouse)
Chr.	Chromosome 9 (mouse)
Band	9 F2|9 59.25 cM	Start	108,225,052 bp
Band	9 F2|9 59.25 cM	End	108,269,744 bp
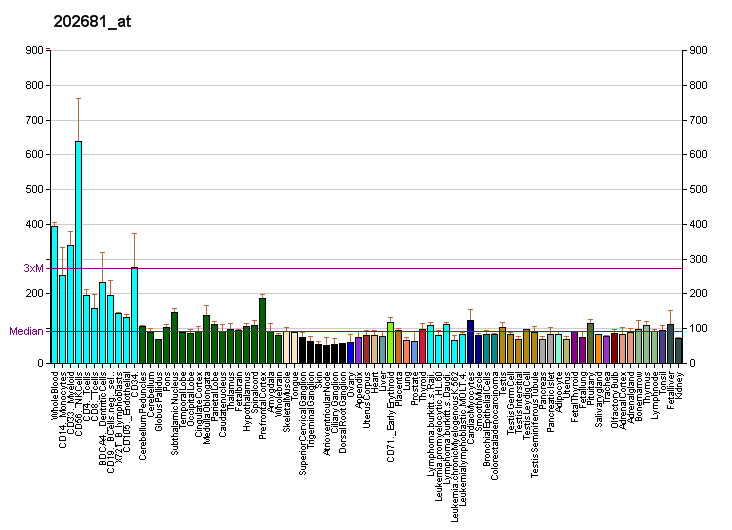

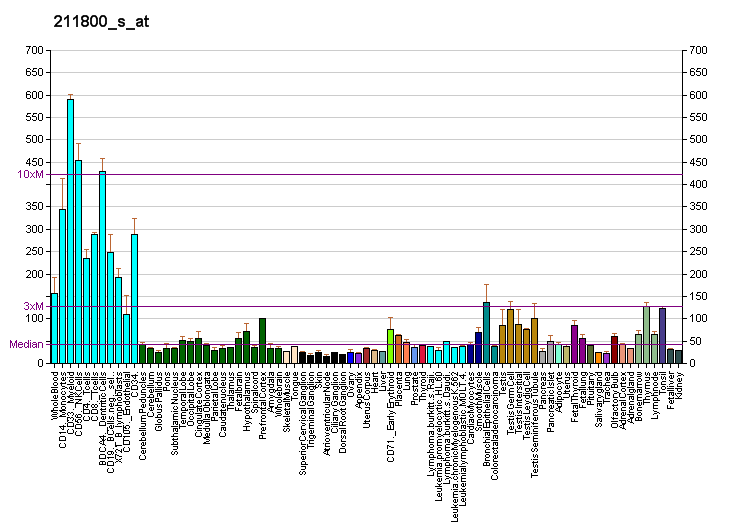

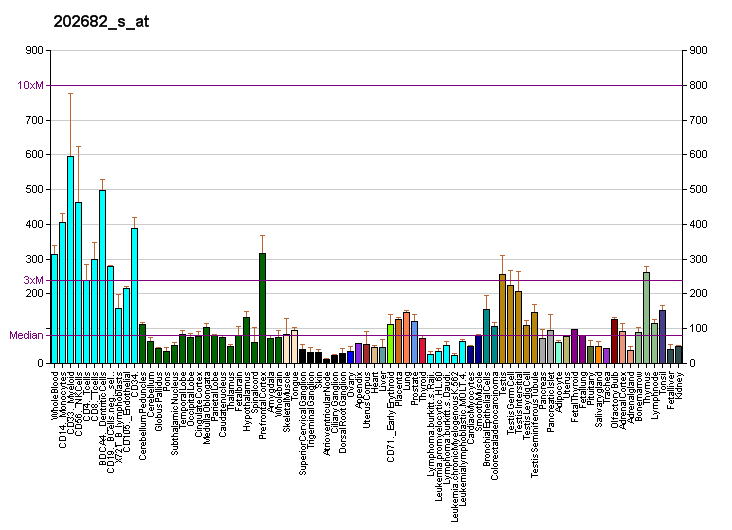
RNA expression pattern
Bgee	Human / Mouse (ortholog); Top expressed in: pancreatic ductal cell; endothelial cell; sural nerve; blood; epithelium of colon; monocyte; tonsil; nipple; sperm; pylorus / Top expressed in: spermatid; spermatocyte; intestinal villus; yolk sac; Ileal epithelium; granulocyte; tail of embryo; neural layer of retina; ventricular zone; esophagus; More reference expression data
BioGPS	More reference expression data
Gene ontology
Molecular function	peptidase activity; adenosine receptor binding; hydrolase activity; thiol-dependent deubiquitinase; metal ion binding; cysteine-type peptidase activity; identical protein binding; protein binding
Cellular component	nucleus; lysosome; plasma membrane; cytoplasm; cytosol
Biological process	ubiquitin-dependent protein catabolic process; spliceosomal tri-snRNP complex assembly; regulation of protein stability; proteolysis; negative regulation of protein ubiquitination; protein localization to cell surface; protein deubiquitination
Sources:Amigo / QuickGO
Orthologs
Databases	NCBI: entry; OMA: entry
Species	Human	Mouse
Entrez	7375	22258
Ensembl	ENSG00000114316	ENSMUSG00000032612
UniProt	Q13107	P35123
RefSeq (mRNA)	NM_199443; NM_001251877; NM_003363	NM_011678; NM_001311157
RefSeq (protein)	NP_001238806; NP_003354; NP_955475	NP_001298086; NP_035808
Location (UCSC)	Chr 3: 49.28 – 49.34 Mb	Chr 9: 108.23 – 108.27 Mb
PubMed search
- Wikidata
View/Edit Human	View/Edit Mouse

Ubiquitin specific protease 4 (USP4) is an enzyme that cleaves ubiquitin from a number of protein substrates. Prior to the standardization of nomenclature USP4 was known as UNP, and was one of the first deubiquitinating enzymes to be identified in mammals. In the mouse and human the USP4 protein is encoded by a gene containing 22 exons.

This protein is a member of cysteine peptidase family C19. As a deubiquitinating enzyme it is unusual in having the capacity to cleave ubiquitin-proline bonds. This property may reflect structural flexibility in the active site of the enzyme, and may explain its ability to cleave ubiquitin chains of various linkages. USP4 has substrates of important function in a number of cell signalling pathways, including the NF-κB, TGF-β, Wnt/β-catenin, p53, and spliceosome pathways. Other substrates include the adenosine A2A receptor and the Ro52 (TRIM21) protein.

USP4 is a nucleocytoplasmic shuttling protein that bears a functional nuclear localization signal (NLS) ^{766}QPQKKKK^{772} and a nuclear export signal (NES) ^{133}VEVYLLELKL^{142}. Those signals initiate the translocation of USP4 to the nucleus from the cytoplasm and vice versa, respectively. The proportion of cytoplasmic to nuclear USP4 pool varies depending on the cell type, the phase of cell cycle and the level of protein expression.

== Interactions ==
USP4 has been shown to interact with the tumor suppressor pRb protein and the pocket-related proteins p107 and p130.
