= Shugoshin 1 =

Protein-coding gene in the species Homo sapiens

SGO1

Identifiers
- Aliases: SGO1, NY-BR-85, SGO, Sgo1, CAID, SGOL1, shugoshin 1
- External IDs: OMIM: 609168; MGI: 1919665; GeneCards: SGO1
Available structures
PDB	Ortholog search: PDBe RCSB
PDB	List of PDB id codes 3FGA, 3Q6S, 4A0I

Gene location (Human)
Chr.	Chromosome 3 (human)
Band	3p24.3	Start	20,160,593 bp
Band	3p24.3	End	20,186,206 bp

Gene location (Mouse)
Chr.	Chromosome 17 (mouse)
Band	17|17 C	Start	53,981,814 bp
Band	17|17 C	End	53,996,361 bp
RNA expression pattern
Bgee	Human / Mouse (ortholog); Top expressed in: gonad; ventricular zone; buccal mucosa cell; testicle; ganglionic eminence; bone marrow cell; secondary oocyte; stromal cell of endometrium; appendix; mucosa of transverse colon / Top expressed in: yolk sac; tail of embryo; genital tubercle; secondary oocyte; zygote; embryo; ventricular zone; blastocyst; otic vesicle; embryo; More reference expression data
BioGPS	n/a
Gene ontology
Molecular function	kinase binding; protein binding
Cellular component	centrosome; spindle pole; chromosome; microtubule organizing center; chromosome, centromeric region; cytoskeleton; nucleus; kinetochore; condensed chromosome, centromeric region; cytoplasm; nucleoplasm; cytosol
Biological process	chromosome segregation; meiotic chromosome segregation; cell division; cell cycle; attachment of spindle microtubules to kinetochore; centriole-centriole cohesion; mitotic sister chromatid cohesion, centromeric
Sources:Amigo / QuickGO
Orthologs
Databases	NCBI: entry; OMA: entry
Species	Human	Mouse
Entrez	151648	72415
Ensembl	ENSG00000129810	ENSMUSG00000023940
UniProt	Q5FBB7	Q9CXH7
RefSeq (mRNA)	NM_001012409; NM_001012410; NM_001012411; NM_001012412; NM_001012413 NM_001199251; NM_001199252; NM_001199253; NM_001199254; NM_001199255; NM_001199256; NM_001199257; NM_138484	NM_028232
RefSeq (protein)	NP_001012409; NP_001012410; NP_001012411; NP_001012412; NP_001012413 NP_001186180; NP_001186181; NP_001186182; NP_001186183; NP_001186184; NP_001186185; NP_001186186; NP_612493	NP_082508
Location (UCSC)	Chr 3: 20.16 – 20.19 Mb	Chr 17: 53.98 – 54 Mb
PubMed search
- Wikidata
View/Edit Human	View/Edit Mouse

Shugoshin 1 or Shugoshin-like 1, is a protein that in humans is encoded by the SGO1 gene.

== Mechanisms ==
A physical mechanism that guarantees the accurate segregation of sister chromatids during mitosis arises from the ring shaped cohesin complex consisting of 4 subunits (SMC1A/B, SMC3, SCC1, and SA1/2 in humans). This complex encircles the two sister chromatids and resists the pulling force of microtubules. The characteristic X-shape chromosomes are formed due to the centromeric cohesin protected by Shugoshin-PP2A complex.

Kinetochore localization of Sgo1-PP2A is dependent upon phosphorylation on histone H2A of nucleosome, which is the important substrate of spindle checkpoint kinase BUB1. Centromeric cohesin and H2A-pT120 specify two distinct pools of Sgo1-PP2A at inner centromeres and kinetochores respectively, while the CDK1/cyclin B phosphorylation on Sgo1 is essential for Sgo1-PP2A to protect centromeric cohesin, not only for bringing PP2A to cohesin, but also physically shield out the negative regulator WAPAL from cohesin.
