= Wings apart-like protein homolog =

Protein-coding gene in the species Homo sapiens

WAPL
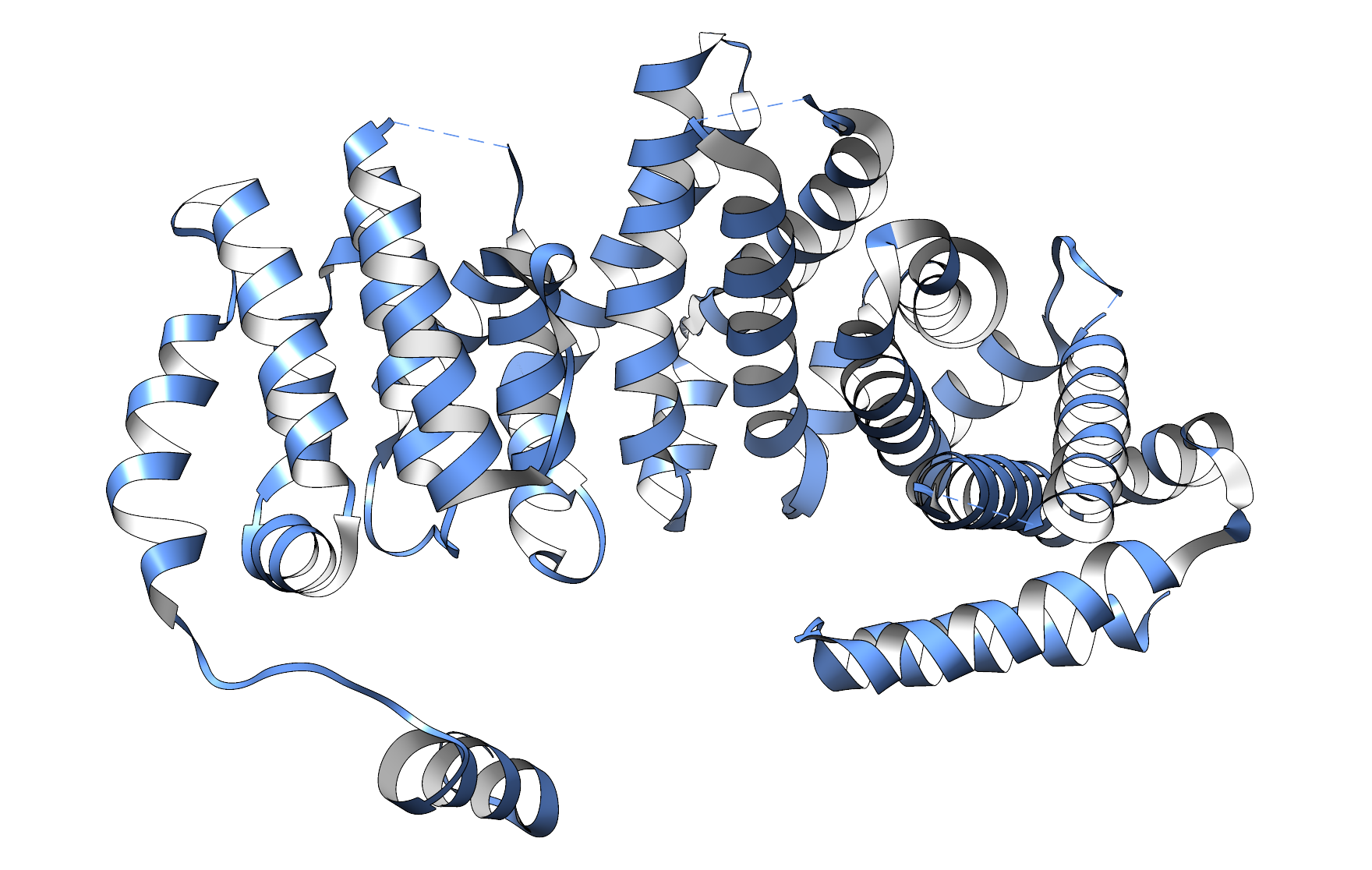

Identifiers
- Aliases: WAPL, FOE, KIAA0261, WAPAL, WAPL cohesin release factor
- External IDs: OMIM: 610754; MGI: 2675859; GeneCards: WAPL
Available structures
PDB	Ortholog search: PDBe RCSB
PDB	List of PDB id codes 4K6J, 5HDT

Gene location (Human)
Chr.	Chromosome 10 (human)
Band	10q23.2	Start	86,435,256 bp
Band	10q23.2	End	86,521,792 bp

Gene location (Mouse)
Chr.	Chromosome 14 (mouse)
Band	14|14 B	Start	34,395,885 bp
Band	14|14 B	End	34,469,940 bp
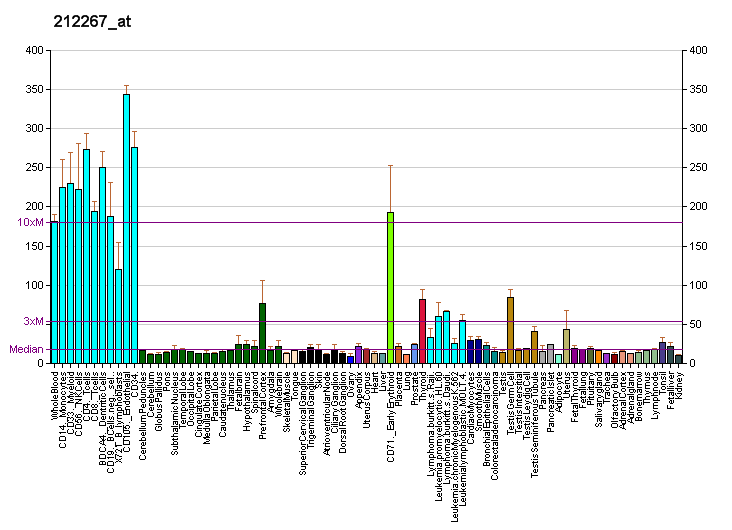

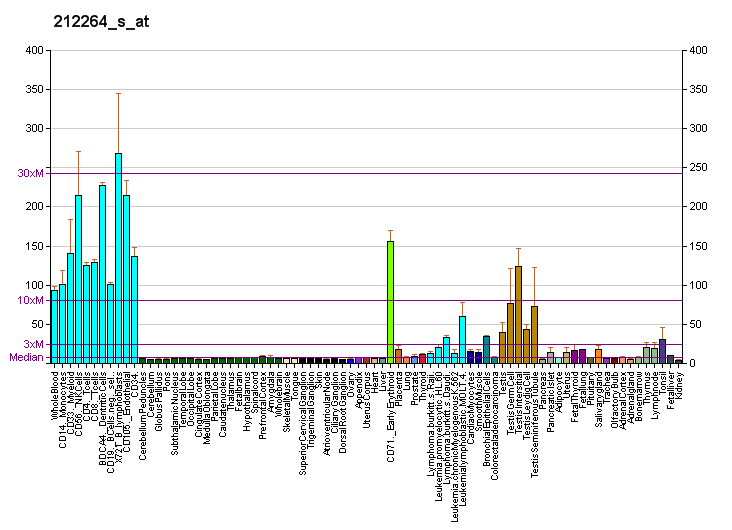
RNA expression pattern
Bgee	Human / Mouse (ortholog); Top expressed in: secondary oocyte; sperm; ventricular zone; amniotic fluid; gonad; testicle; skin of thigh; Achilles tendon; skin of hip; caput epididymis / Top expressed in: zygote; secondary oocyte; tail of embryo; otolith organ; utricle; primary oocyte; hair follicle; Paneth cell; ureter; genital tubercle; More reference expression data
BioGPS	More reference expression data
Gene ontology
Molecular function	protein binding
Cellular component	cytoplasm; cytosol; cohesin complex; chromosome; chromatin; synaptonemal complex; chromosome, centromeric region; nucleus; nucleoplasm
Biological process	negative regulation of sister chromatid cohesion; negative regulation of chromatin binding; positive regulation of fibroblast proliferation; negative regulation of DNA replication; regulation of cohesin loading; cell division; regulation of chromosome segregation; cell cycle; viral process; protein localization to chromatin; response to toxic substance; mitotic sister chromatid cohesion; regulation of chromosome condensation; meiotic chromosome segregation; mitotic cell cycle
Sources:Amigo / QuickGO
Orthologs
Databases	NCBI: entry; OMA: entry
Species	Human	Mouse
Entrez	23063	218914
Ensembl	ENSG00000062650	ENSMUSG00000041408
UniProt	Q7Z5K2	Q65Z40
RefSeq (mRNA)	NM_015045; NM_001318328	NM_001004436; NM_001301330
RefSeq (protein)	NP_001305257; NP_055860	NP_001004436; NP_001288259
Location (UCSC)	Chr 10: 86.44 – 86.52 Mb	Chr 14: 34.4 – 34.47 Mb
PubMed search
- Wikidata
View/Edit Human	View/Edit Mouse

Wings apart-like protein homolog (WAPL) is a protein that in humans is encoded by the WAPL gene (previously WAPAL). WAPL is a key regulator of the Cohesin complex which mediates sister chromatid cohesion, homologous recombination and DNA looping. Cohesin is formed of SMC3, SMC1, RAD21 and either SA1 or SA2. Cohesin has a ring-like arrangement and it is thought that it associates with the chromosome by entrapping it whether as a loop of DNA, a single strand or a pair of sister chromosomes. WAPL forms a complex with PDS5A or PDS5B and releases cohesin from DNA by opening the interface between SMC3 and RAD21.

== Interphase ==
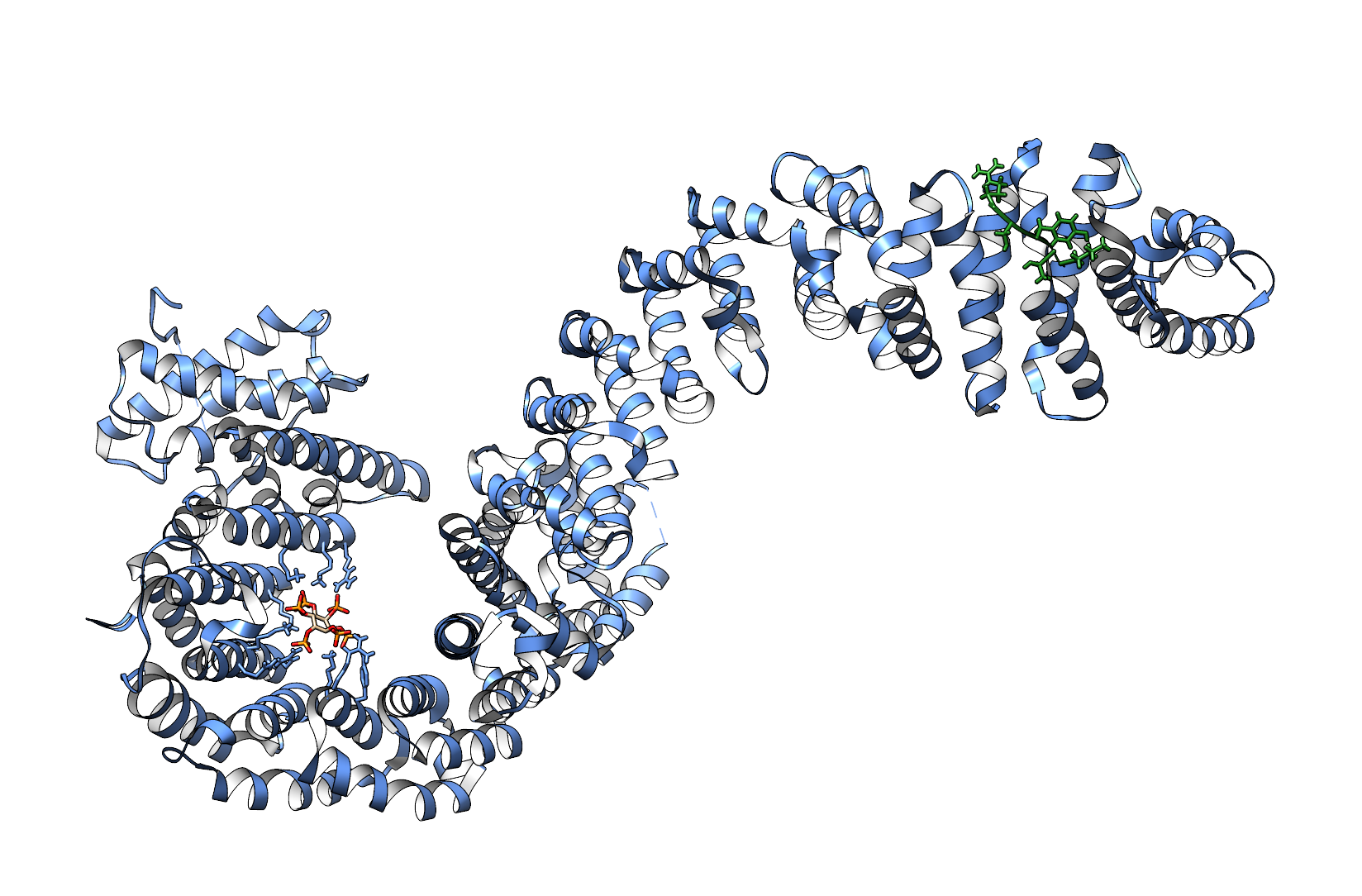
Structure of PDS5B (blue), WAPL (green) and IP6 (PDB 5HDT) (Ouyang et al., 2016)

Cohesin loading begins in telophase and is mediated by NIPBL and its binding partner MAU2. In G1, WAPL forms a complex with PDS5 and removes cohesin from the DNA but it is reloaded by NIPBL-MAU2. The equilibrium between loading and release give cohesin a DNA residence time of 20 minutes. During DNA replication, a fraction of cohesin is acetylated and binds to Sororin making it resistant to WAPL and able to hold sister chromatids together. This is crucial for the maintenance of sister chromatid cohesion because once the sister chromatids are separated, cohesion cannot be reestablished.

== Prophase pathway ==
When a cell enters mitosis, Sororin is phosphorylated causing it to dissociate from cohesin meaning WAPL can remove cohesin from the DNA. A complex of SGOL1 and PP2A dephosphorylates cohesin at the centromere protecting it from WAPL-mediated release. Sister chromatid cohesion is therefore maintained at the centromeres where it is required for mitosis but lost on the arms. This removal of cohesin is known as the Prophase Pathway and results in the X-shape sister chromatids observed in chromosome spreads.

== Mechanism ==
WAPL releases cohesin from DNA by opening the SMC3-RAD21 interface thereby allowing DNA to pass out of the ring. Opening of this interface is regulated by ATP-binding by the SMC subunits. This causes the ATPase head domains to dimerise and deforms the coiled coil of SMC3 therefore disrupting the binding of RAD21 to the coiled coil. It is not known how WAPL regulates the process of ATP binding.
