= PDS5B =

Protein-coding gene in the species Homo sapiens

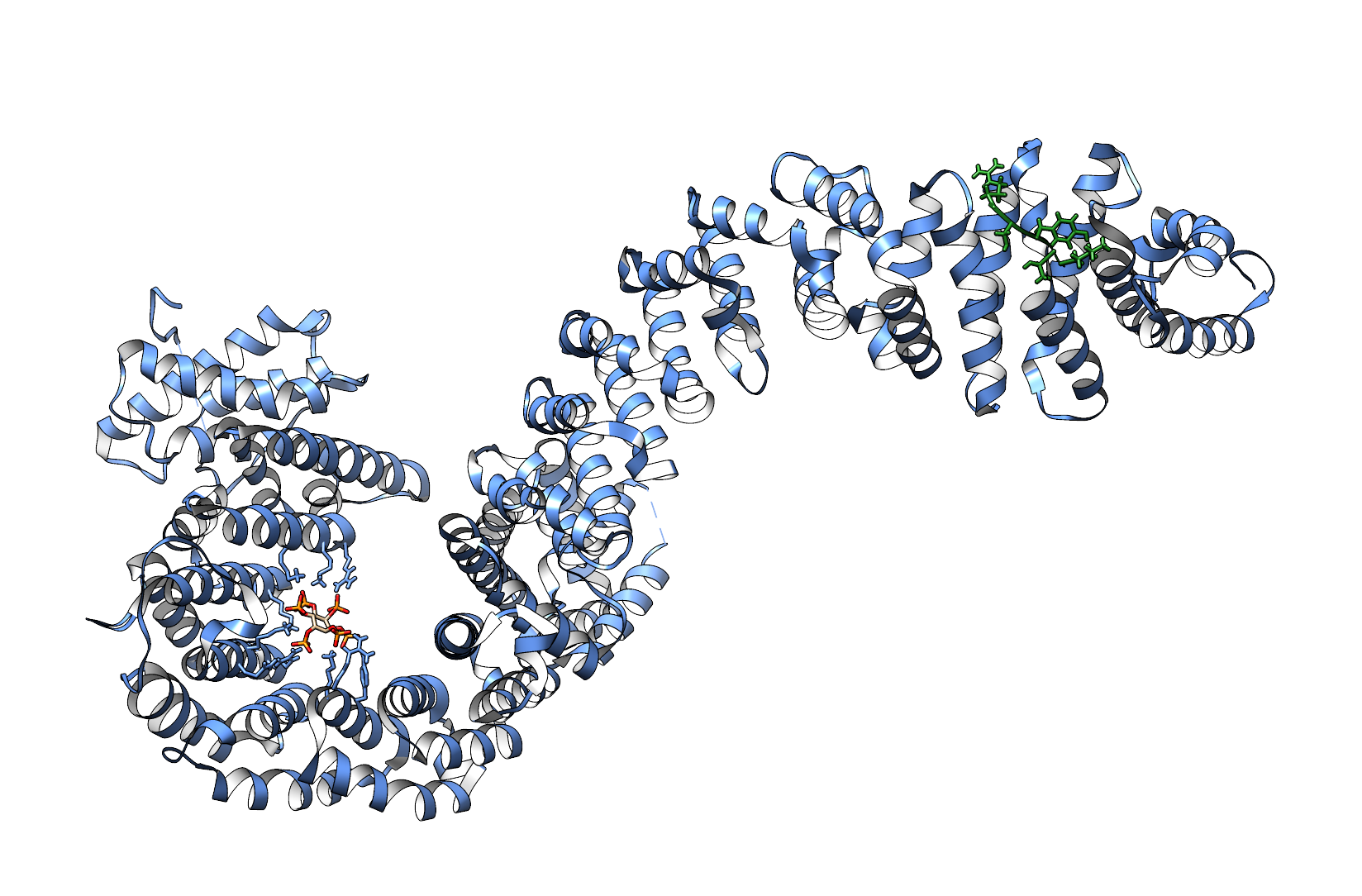

Identifiers
- Aliases: PDS5B, APRIN, AS3, CG008, PDS5 cohesin associated factor B
- External IDs: OMIM: 605333; MGI: 2140945; GeneCards: PDS5B
Available structures
PDB	Ortholog search: PDBe RCSB
PDB	List of PDB id codes 5HDT

Gene location (Human)
Chr.	Chromosome 13 (human)
Band	13q13.1	Start	32,586,452 bp
Band	13q13.1	End	32,778,019 bp

Gene location (Mouse)
Chr.	Chromosome 5 (mouse)
Band	5|5 G3	Start	150,597,204 bp
Band	5|5 G3	End	150,734,155 bp
RNA expression pattern
Bgee	Human / Mouse (ortholog); Top expressed in: Achilles tendon; sural nerve; endothelial cell; testicle; epithelium of colon; ventricular zone; buccal mucosa cell; tibia; bone marrow cell; oocyte / Top expressed in: superior cervical ganglion; otolith organ; utricle; nucleus accumbens; anterior amygdaloid area; renal corpuscle; olfactory tubercle; vas deferens; ventromedial nucleus; paraventricular nucleus of hypothalamus; More reference expression data
BioGPS	n/a
Gene ontology
Molecular function	protein binding; ATP binding; DNA binding
Cellular component	chromosome; cytosol; chromatin; chromosome, centromeric region; nucleoplasm; nucleus
Biological process	cell division; cell cycle; cell population proliferation; regulation of cell population proliferation; mitotic sister chromatid cohesion; negative regulation of cell population proliferation; DNA repair; lens development in camera-type eye; enteric nervous system development; neuroblast migration
Sources:Amigo / QuickGO
Orthologs
Databases	NCBI: entry; OMA: entry
Species	Human	Mouse
Entrez	23047	100710
Ensembl	ENSG00000083642	ENSMUSG00000034021
UniProt	Q9NTI5	Q4VA53
RefSeq (mRNA)	NM_015032; NM_015928	NM_175310; NM_001346503
RefSeq (protein)	NP_055847	NP_001333432; NP_780519
Location (UCSC)	Chr 13: 32.59 – 32.78 Mb	Chr 5: 150.6 – 150.73 Mb
PubMed search
- Wikidata
View/Edit Human	View/Edit Mouse

Sister chromatid cohesion protein PDS5 homolog B (PDS5B) is a protein that in humans is encoded by the PDS5B gene. It is a regulatory subunit of the Cohesin complex which mediates sister chromatid cohesion, homologous recombination and DNA looping. The core cohesin complex is formed of SMC3, SMC1, RAD21 and either SA1 or SA2. PDS5 associates with WAPL to stimulate the release of cohesin from DNA but during DNA replication PDS5 promotes acetylation of SMC3 by ESCO1 and ESCO2.
