= Range Extender (REX) DNA element =

The Range Extender (REX) is a conserved cis-acting DNA element which was identified in 2025. REX confers extreme long-range regulatory functions to gene enhancers in mammalian genomes. The addition of the REX to short- and mid-range enhancers significantly enhance their range of interaction and by one order of magnitude. The REX sequence by itself has no inherent enhancer activity. The activity conferred to other promoters is reported to depend on highly conserved [C/T]AATTA sequences. With the description of a REX a sequence for long-range enhancer-promoter interactions has been found. It has been proposed to molecularly explain how such long-range interactions control developmental genes in mammalian. Mutations in such a REX motif has been shown to abolish the long-distance activity. The element's function or disruption has significant implications as several developmental anomalies are explainable.

== Background ==
Enhancers are regulatory DNA sequences that can alter the transcription of a target gene by interacting with the promoter. An example of such long-range cis-acting regulatory elements is the misregulation of Sonic hedgehog (Shh) within the LMBR1 gene. Further research demonstrated that a conserved non-coding sequence can act as an essential cis-regulatory element and that its deletion resulted in loss of Shh expression. Through this remodelling a high order topology can be established, thereby illustrating the mechanistic principles of REX within chromosome architecture. A more recent study revealed that REX contains a conserved binding domain to enable enhancer action over extreme genomic distances thereby increasing the enhancer-promoter interaction thereby differentiating between long-range and cell-type enhancer functions. Before REX was discovered, it was proposed that such specialized DNA sequence elements might be required for long-range interactions over megabase distances.

== Discovery ==
REX was discovered by in vivo enhancer-replacement in mice. In those experiments, REX motifs were mutated which abolished long-range interactions while short-range activities remained intact.

== Sequence features and binding preferences ==
REX contains highly conserved domain motifs, such as [C/T]AATTA. The TAAT core has been shown a key determinant of DNA binding specificity. This variation in the flanking bases suggests REX to function by recruiting homeodomain transcription factors.

== Mechanistic 3D genome organization ==
Three-dimensional organisation with chromatin loop extrusion provides the basis for topologically associated domains (TADs). TADs are an architectural feature of genome organization. TADs and loops are organized by the protein cohesin, while their positioning and stability is modulated by effectors such as CTCF and WAPL. Through spatial and temporal imaging it was shown that long-range transcriptional regulation might be dependent on transient physical interaction.
