= Cohesin =

Protein complex that regulates the separation of sister chromatids during cell division

Diagram of cohesin showing its four constituent protein subunits

Cohesin is a protein complex that mediates sister chromatid cohesion, homologous recombination, and DNA looping. Cohesin is formed of SMC3, SMC1, SCC1 and SCC3 (SA1 or SA2 in humans). Cohesin holds sister chromatids together after DNA replication until anaphase when removal of cohesin leads to separation of sister chromatids. The complex forms a ring-like structure and it is believed that sister chromatids are held together by entrapment inside the cohesin ring. Cohesin is a member of the SMC family of protein complexes which includes Condensin, MukBEF and SMC-ScpAB.

Cohesin was separately discovered in budding yeast (Saccharomyces cerevisiae) both by Douglas Koshland and Kim Nasmyth in 1997.

== Structure and subunits ==
Models of SMC and cohesin structure

Cohesin is a multi-subunit protein complex, made up of SMC1, SMC3, RAD21 and SCC3 (SA1 or SA2). SMC1 and SMC3 are members of the Structural Maintenance of Chromosomes (SMC) family. SMC proteins have two main structural characteristics: an ATP-binding cassette-like 'head' domain with ATPase activity (formed by the interaction of the N- and C- terminals) and a hinge domain that allows dimerization of SMCs. The head and the hinge domains are connected to each other via long anti-parallel coiled coils. The dimer is present in a V-shaped form, connected by the hinges.

The N-terminal domain of RAD21 contains two α-helices which forms a three helix bundle with the coiled coil of SMC3. The central region of RAD21 is thought to be largely unstructured but contains several binding sites for regulators of cohesin. This includes a binding site for SA1 or SA2, recognition motifs for separase cleavage and a region that is competitively bound by PDS5A, PDS5B or NIPBL. The C-terminal domain of RAD21 forms a winged helix that binds two β-sheets in the Smc1 head domain.

Once RAD21 binds the SMC proteins, SCC3 can also associate with RAD21. When RAD21 binds on both SMC1 and SMC3, the cohesin complex forms a closed ring structure. The interfaces between the SMC subunits and RAD21 can open to allow DNA to pass in and out of the cohesin ring.

A structure of the entire cohesin complex has been solved using cryo-electron microscopy. Key findings from the structural studies include:

1. Ring Architecture. Cohesin forms a tripartite ring where the SMC proteins (SMC1 and SMC3) dimerize via their hinge domains and are bridged by RAD21.
2. ATPase Domain. The head domains of SMC proteins contain ATPase sites that drive cohesin's dynamic interactions with DNA, mostly loop extrusion.
3. Conformational Flexibility. Cohesin is a highly dynamic protein, which exist in the open and closed conformations, interchanging by bending in the so-called elbows (see Loop extrusion for more).
4. Regulatory Interactions. Accessory proteins like WAPL and PDS5 have been visualized interacting with the cohesin complex, elucidating their roles in unloading and stabilizing cohesin on chromatin.

== Function ==
Cohesin functions can broadly separated into two categories: roles in trans (between different chromosomes due to cohesion between them) and in cis (within the same chromosome due to loop extrusion). Although these two functions are tightly interlinked, it has been possible to separate them by creating a cohesin hinge mutant that can extrude loops but cannot maintain cohesion.

=== Role in chromatin compaction and global organization ===
1. DNA compaction. Cohesin helps to compact DNA by creating the loops of DNA in an ATP-dependent manner via the process called loop extrusion.
2. Segregation of chromosomes. Cohesin's activity promotes segregation of chromosomes into chromosomal territories.

=== Role in cell division ===
Cohesin plays an important role in cell division in both mitosis and meiosis.

- During mitosis:
  1. Maintains sister chromatid cohesion. Cohesin keeps the sister chromatids connected during metaphase ensuring that each sister chromatid segregates to opposite poles during cell division. Without cohesin, the cell would be unable to control sister chromatid segregation since there would be no way of ensuring whether the spindle fiber—attached on each sister chromatid—is from a different pole. Other proteins modulate cohesin function by regulating this process, such as PDS5A, PDS5B, NIPBL and ESCO1 in mammalian cells.
  2. Helps to assemble bipolar spindle apparatus. Cohesin ensures the attachment of spindle microtubules and sister kinetochores onto the chromosomes. This is tightly related to the correct sister chromatid segregation towards the two spindle poles. Dysregulation of this process leads to premature chromosomes separation and multipolar spindle-formation. The proteins Shugoshin 1 (or SGO1), Rae1 and NuMA are associated with cohesin in this assembly process.
- During meiosis, cohesin recruits additional meiotic-specific component Rec8, that is an essential player in these three processes:
  1. Sister chromatids cohesion.
  2. Homologous chromosomes pairing.
  3. Recombination during meiosis.

Cohesin has also been found to be crucial for DNA damage checkpoint and repair. It participates in repairing double-strand breaks in DNA via homologous recombination, where the sister chromatid is used as a template for sequence reconstruction.

=== Role in regulation of gene expression ===
Cohesin might play an important role in regulation of gene expression through the following mechanisms:

1. Cohesin mediating enhancer-promoter interactions by bridging them in cis.
2. Cohesin connecting CTCF sites in cis by interacting with CTCFs in a highly specific and oriented manner.
3. Cohesin creating regulatory TADs which are the environments for promoter-enhancer interactions.

=== Other functions ===
- Cohesin has been found to be essential for embryo development. Cohesin knockout is lethal for development of mouse and zebrafish.
- Cohesin deletion in mature macrophages leads to impairment of inflammatory response of the innate immune system and restricts transcriptional response of primary macrophages to microbial signals.

== Localization on DNA ==
Cohesin binding along the chromosomal DNA is considered to be dynamic and its location changes based on gene transcription, specific DNA sequence and presence of chromosome-associated proteins. There are several observations on cohesin patterns of localization on DNA.

- Accumulation at CTCF sites: This happens due to direct interaction of cohesin subunits SA2 and SCC1 with CTCF. Briefly, in the process of loop extrusion, cohesin moves actively along the two DNA double helices, translocating one of them with respect to the other. Thus, the loop can become smaller or larger. The loop extrusion process stops when cohesin encounters the architectural chromatin protein CTCF. The CTCF site needs to be in a proper orientation to stop cohesin.
- Accumulation at promoters: Two hypotheses were proposed to explain accumulation of cohesin at the gene promoters:
1. Cohesin location is influenced by the orientation of neighboring genes and it is most frequently located in areas of convergent transcription. Gene orientation depends on the direction of transcription and can be of three types: head-to-head, head-to-tail and tail-to-tail. The tail-to-tail configuration results in the convergence of transcription machinery. One hypothesis states that the RNA polymerase "pushes" cohesin along the DNA, causing them to move towards the direction of the RNA polymerases. Changing the transcription pattern of genes changes the location of cohesin indicating that localization of cohesin may depend on transcription.
2. In another model, chromatin loop extrusion is pushed by transcription generated supercoiling ensuring also that cohesin relocalizes quickly and loops grow with reasonable speed and in a good direction. In addition, the supercoiling-driven loop extrusion mechanism is consistent with earlier explanations proposing why topologically associating domains (TADs) flanked by convergent CTCF binding sites form more stable chromatin loops than TADs flanked by divergent CTCF binding sites. In this model, the supercoiling also stimulates enhancer promoter contacts and it is proposed that transcription of eRNA sends the first wave of supercoiling that can activate mRNA transcription in a given TAD.
- Accumulation at AT-rich sequences: Cohesins can be frequently found in chromosome arms that have AT-rich DNA sequences indicating that DNA sequence may be an independent factor of cohesin binding.
- Accumulation at centromeres: Cohesin rings, especially in budding yeast, are also located in the region surrounding the centromere. Two hypotheses may explain this: the presence of repetitive heterochromatic DNA in centromeres and the presence of chromosome-associated proteins. For example, Schizosaccharomyces pombe have multiple copies of specific heterochromatic DNA whose involvement in cohesion binding has been proven. Budding yeast lacks repetitive sequences and, therefore, requires a different mechanism for cohesion binding. Evidence suggests that binding of cohesin to the budding yeast centromere region depends on chromosome-associated proteins of the kinetochore that mediate cohesion association to pericentric regions (the kinetochore is an enhancer of pericentric cohesin binding).

== Cohesin in sister chromatid cohesion ==
=== Mechanism of sister chromatid cohesion ===
It is not clear how the cohesin ring links sister chromatids together. There are two possible scenarios:

1. Cohesin subunits bind to each sister chromatid and form a bridge between the two.
2. Since cohesin has a ring structure, it is able to encircle both sister chromatids.

Current evidence suggests that the second scenario is the most likely. Proteins that are essential for sister chromatid cohesion, such as Smc3 and Scc1, do not regulate the formation of covalent bonds between cohesin and DNA, indicating that DNA interaction is not sufficient for cohesion. In addition, disturbing the ring structure of cohesin through cleavage of Smc3 or Scc1 triggers premature sister chromatid segregation in vivo. This shows that the ring structure is important for cohesin's function.

Early studies suggested various ways in which cohesin may entrap DNA, including as a monomer that holds both homologues together, and a "hand-cuff" model where two intertwining cohesin complexes each hold one sister chromatid. While some studies support the idea of a hand-cuff model, the model is inconsistent with a number of experimental observations, and is generally considered to entrap chromatin as a monomer.

Even though the ring hypothesis appears to be valid, there are still questions about the number of rings required to hold sister chromatids together. One possibility is that one ring surrounds the two chromatids. Another possibility involves the creation of a dimer where each ring surrounds one sister chromatid. The two rings are connected to each other through formation of a bridge that holds the two sister chromatids together.

The topology and structure of these subunits has been best characterized in budding yeast, but the sequence conservation of these proteins and biochemical and electron microscopic observations imply that cohesin complexes in other species are very similar in their structure .

The cohesin complex is established during the initial stages of S-phase. The complexes associate with chromosomes before DNA replication occurs. Once cells start replicating their DNA, cohesin rings close and link the sister chromatids together. Cohesin complexes must be present during S-phase in order for cohesion to take place. It is unclear, however, how cohesin is loaded on the chromosomes during G1. There are two proposed hypotheses so far:

1. The ATPase domain of the SMC proteins interacts with DNA and this interaction initially mediates the loading of cohesin complexes on chromosomes.
2. Several proteins aid in the loading process. For example, Scc2 and Scc4 are both required for cohesin to load in budding yeast.

=== Dissociation of sister chromatid cohesion ===
The anaphase promoting complex associated to Cdc20 (APC/C-cdc20) marks Securin (anaphase inhibitor) for degradation by the proteasome. Securin is cleaved at anaphase, following APC/C-cdc20 mediated degradation, and it renders separase (a protease, inhibited by the association with securin) to cleave the kleisin subunit. An alpha-kleisin is associated with the cohesin complex, linking both SMC 3 and SMC 1 together, with the exact kleisin varying between mitosis and meiosis (Scc1 and Rec8 respectively), and its cleavage ultimately leads to the removal of cohesin from chromosomes.

Dissociation of sister chromatids cohesion defines anaphase onset, which establishes two sets of identical chromosomes at each pole of the cell (telophase). Then the two daughter cells separate, and a new round of the cell cycle freshly starts in each one, at the stage of G0. When cells are ready to divide, because cell size is big enough or because they receive the appropriate stimulus, they activate the mechanism to enter into the G1 stage of cell cycle, and they duplicate most organelles during S (synthesis) phase, including their centrosome. Therefore, when the cell division process will end, each daughter cell will receive a complete set of organelles. At the same time, during S phase all cells must duplicate their DNA very precisely, a process termed DNA replication. Once DNA replication has finished, in eukaryotes the DNA molecule is compacted and condensed, to form the mitotic chromosomes, each one constituted by two sister chromatids, which stay held together by the establishment of cohesion between them; each chromatid is a complete DNA molecule, attached via microtubules to one of the two centrosomes of the dividing cell, located at opposed poles of the cell. To avoid premature sister chromatid separation, the APC/C is maintained in an inactive state bound to different molecules, which are part of a complex mechanism termed the spindle assembly checkpoint.

== Cohesin in meiosis ==
Cohesin proteins SMC1β, SMC3, REC8 and STAG3 appear to participate in cohesion of sister chromatids throughout the meiotic process in human oocytes. SMC1β, REC8 and STAG3 proteins are meiosis specific cohesins.

The STAG3 protein appears to be essential for female meiosis. A homozygous frameshift mutation in the Stag3 gene was identified in a large consanguineous family with premature ovarian failure. Also, female mice deficient in STAG3 are sterile, and their fetal oocytes arrest at early prophase 1.

During meiosis, establishment of cohesion of sister chromatids via cohesin rings is necessary for ensuring homologous recombination-mediated DNA repair and subsequent proper chromosome segregation. The cohesin proteins are loaded on to chromatids during female fetal life and are not replenished over time, and thus with advancing maternal age aneuploidy in oocytes tends to increase resulting in decreased fecundity and increased infertility and miscarriage. Also, variants of cohesin proteins are associated with primary ovarian insufficiency, trisomy in offspring and non-obstructive azoospermia.

Oocyte loss is a natural process that accelerates as women enter their mid-thirties, and thus has a significant effect on female reproduction. Aged oocytes have a lower DNA repair capacity linked to cohesin deterioration. Reduced cohesin levels make aged oocytes more vulnerable to persistent DNA damage leading to oocyte loss.

== Cohesin in loop extrusion ==
Loop extrusion, an ATP-dependent process driven by SMC-family proteins like cohesin and condensin, involves the translocation of DNA to form loops. This process continues until the extruding complex is released or encounters a barrier. In vertebrates, one well-studied factor that limits loop extrusion by cohesin is the CCCTC-binding factor (CTCF). CTCF directly interacts with cohesin, stabilizing it on chromatin and anchoring loop boundaries. The loop extrusion process leads to the formation of topologically associating domains (TADs) and loops in interphase.

== Evolution ==
The SMC proteins are found across the tree of life as early as in prokaryotes and have been conserved through evolution. In particular, the coils of SMC1 and SMC3 are conserved with an amino acid divergence of less than 0.5%.

In bacteria, SMC-like protein MukBEF is involved in chromosome compaction and segregation. Most cohesin subunits are present in different eukaryotic taxa. However, although uniformly present, cohesin might have different functions in different taxa. For example, in Drosophila melanogaster the extruding role of cohesin is debatable.

Cohesin subunits in different eukaryotes may have different names:

Name	Saccharomyces cerevisiae	Schizosaccharomyces pombe	Drosophila	Vertebrates
Smc1	Smc1	Psm1	DmSmc1	Smc1
Smc3	Smc3	Psm3	Cap	Smc3
α-Kleisin subunit	Mcd1/Pds3/Scc1	Rad21	DmRad21	Rad21
Stromalin subunits	Scc3	Psc3	DmSA	SA1 and SA2/STAG1 and STAG2
Scc2	Scc2		Nipped-B	NIPBL
Scc4	Scc4		Mau2	MAU2
PDS5	PDS5		Pds5	PDS5A
Wapl	Rad61/Wpl1		Wapl	WAPL
Cohesin acetyl transferase (CoAT)	ECO1/CTF7		Deco/San	ESCO1 and ESCO2
Cohesin deacetylase (CoDAC)	Hos1		?	HDAC8

== Research techniques to study cohesin ==
- Chromatin Immunoprecipitation (ChIP): Used to study cohesin-DNA interactions. Includes variations, such as ChIP-chip or, more recent whole-genome ChIP-Seq.
- Chromosomes conformation capture: Used to analyze formation of loops and TADs that are frequently mediated by cohesin. This includes 3C, and more recent whole-genome versions Hi-C and Micro-C. Notably, rapid degradation of cohesin lead to drastic changes in Hi-C interaction patterns, such as change of chromatin scaling and disappearance of most TADs and dots.
- CRISPR/Cas9: Enables the study of cohesin mutations and functional analysis.
- Live-cell imaging: Visualizes cohesin dynamic on chromatin.

== Clinical significance ==
=== Cohesinopathies ===
The term "cohesinopathy" has been used to describe conditions affecting the cohesin complex.

These conditions include:

- Cornelia de Lange Syndrome (CdLS)
  - Cause: Mutations in NIPBL, SMC1A, SMC3, HDAC8, and RAD21.
  - Symptoms: Growth retardation, intellectual disability, and limb deformities among others.
- Roberts syndrome (RBS)
  - Cause: Mutations in ESCO2, impairing cohesin acetylation.
  - Symptoms: Prenatal growth failure, craniofacial abnormalities, and limb malformations.
- Warsaw breakage syndrome (WABS)
  - Cause: Mutations in DDX11, a helicase interacting with cohesin.
  - Symptoms: Chromosomal instability, intellectual disability, and growth defects.

=== Cohesin in cancer ===
Cohesin mutations are frequently observed in cancers such as acute myeloid leukemia (AML), myelodysplastic syndromes (MDS), colorectal cancer, glioblastoma and bladder cancer. Among the cohesin genes, STAG2 is the most commonly mutated, accounting for approximately half of all cohesin-related mutations observed in cancer.

- STAG2 mutations are linked to chromosomal instability and poor prognosis in AML and MDS.
- Disruption of DNA repair due to cohesin loss contributes to increased mutational burden in tumors.

=== Other ===
The cohesin subunit STAG2 appears to play a significant role in hematopoietic function, as its loss enhances stem cell self-renewal while impairing differentiation.

== See also ==
- Condensin
- SMC protein
- Establishment of sister chromatid cohesion
- Loop extrusion
