= Biorientation =

Biorientation is the phenomenon whereby microtubules emanating from different microtubule organizing centres (MTOCs) attach to kinetochores of sister chromatids. This results in the sister chromatids moving to opposite poles of the cell during cell division, and thus results in both daughter cells having the same genetic information.

Kinetochores link the chromosomes to the mitotic spindle - doing so relies on intricate interactions between microtubules and kinetochores. It has been shown that, in fission yeast, microtubule attachment can make frequent erroneous attachments early in mitosis, which are then often corrected prior to anaphase onset by a system which uses protein kinase to affect kinetochore microtubules in the absence of astriction between sister chromatids.

Proper biorientation allows correct chromosomal segregation in cell division. Although this process is not well understood, high-resolution imaging of live mouse oocytes has revealed that chromosomes form an intermediate chromosomal configuration, called the prometaphase belt, which occurs prior to biorientation. Kitajima, et al. estimate that about 90% of chromosomes require correction of the kinetochore-microtubule attachments (using Aurora kinase )prior to obtaining correct biorientation. This suggests a possible cause for the elevated frequency of abnormal chromosome counts (aneuploidy) in mammals.

Several methods are postulated by which chromosomes biorient when they are located far from the pole with which they need to connect. One mechanism involves the kinetochore meeting microtubules from the distal pole. Another method described is based on observations that the kinetochore of one pole-oriented chromosome attaches to kinetochore fibers of an already bioriented chromosome. These two mechanisms possibly work in concert - certain chromosomes may biorient via encounters with microtubules from distal poles, which is then followed by kinetochore fibers that speed up biorientation with already-oriented chromosomes. Researchers have detached grasshopper spermatocytes from spindle fibers and moved them away from the metaphase plate via micromanipulation. Several chromosomes instantly bioriented, as deduced from the observation that, upon reattachment, the chromosomes moved to the metaphase plate without moving to the poles.
