= RAD21 =

Protein-coding gene in humans

Identifiers
- Aliases: RAD21, CDLS4, HR21, HMCD1, NXP1, SCC1, hHR21, RAD21 cohesin complex component, MGS
- External IDs: OMIM: 606462; MGI: 108016; GeneCards: RAD21
Available structures
PDB	Ortholog search: PDBe RCSB
PDB	List of PDB id codes 4PJU, 4PJW, 4PK7

Gene location (Human)
Chr.	Chromosome 8 (human)
Band	8q24.11	Start	116,845,934 bp
Band	8q24.11	End	116,874,776 bp

Gene location (Mouse)
Chr.	Chromosome 15 (mouse)
Band	15|15 C	Start	51,825,636 bp
Band	15|15 C	End	51,855,143 bp
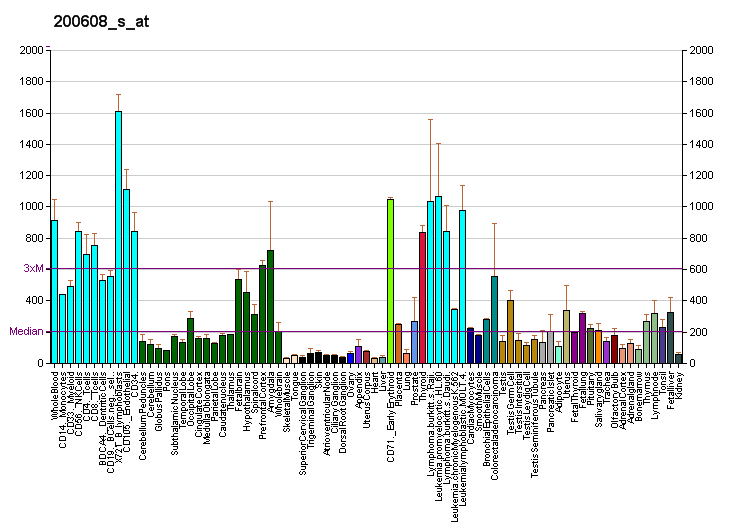

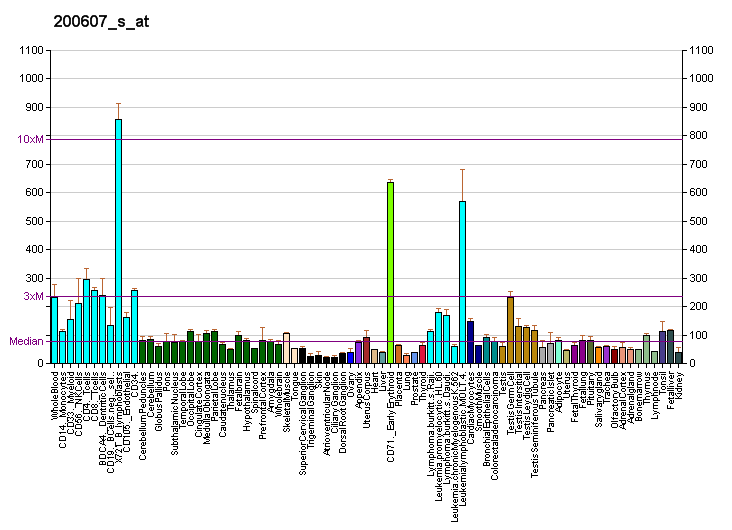
RNA expression pattern
Bgee	Human / Mouse (ortholog); Top expressed in: ventricular zone; ganglionic eminence; superficial temporal artery; epithelium of nasopharynx; germinal epithelium; cerebellar vermis; pars reticulata; subthalamic nucleus; pars compacta; trabecular bone / Top expressed in: Gonadal ridge; human fetus; left lung lobe; hand; tail of embryo; dermis; medial ganglionic eminence; migratory enteric neural crest cell; lobe of cerebellum; genital tubercle; More reference expression data
BioGPS	More reference expression data
Gene ontology
Molecular function	DNA-binding transcription activator activity, RNA polymerase II-specific; protein binding; chromatin binding; protein-containing complex binding
Cellular component	cytosol; membrane; chromosome; nucleoplasm; condensed nuclear chromosome; nuclear chromosome; chromatin; chromosome, centromeric region; nucleus; cohesin complex; nuclear matrix; meiotic cohesin complex; spindle pole; cytoplasm; cytoskeleton
Biological process	reciprocal meiotic recombination; DNA recombination; chromosome segregation; regulation of transcription by RNA polymerase II; transcription by RNA polymerase II; cellular response to DNA damage stimulus; cell division; double-strand break repair; cell cycle; protein localization to chromatin; DNA repair; positive regulation of transcription by RNA polymerase II; apoptotic process; sister chromatid cohesion; positive regulation of sister chromatid cohesion; negative regulation of G2/M transition of mitotic cell cycle; negative regulation of mitotic metaphase/anaphase transition; meiosis; multicellular organism development
Sources:Amigo / QuickGO
Orthologs
Databases	NCBI: entry; OMA: entry
Species	Human	Mouse
Entrez	5885	19357
Ensembl	ENSG00000164754	ENSMUSG00000022314
UniProt	O60216	Q61550
RefSeq (mRNA)	NM_006265	NM_009009
RefSeq (protein)	NP_006256	NP_033035
Location (UCSC)	Chr 8: 116.85 – 116.87 Mb	Chr 15: 51.83 – 51.86 Mb
PubMed search
- Wikidata
View/Edit Human	View/Edit Mouse

Double-strand-break repair protein rad21 homolog is a protein that in humans is encoded by the RAD21 gene. RAD21 (also known as Mcd1, Scc1, KIAA0078, NXP1, HR21), an essential gene, encodes a DNA double-strand break (DSB) repair protein that is evolutionarily conserved in all eukaryotes from budding yeast to humans. RAD21 protein is a structural component of the highly conserved cohesin complex consisting of RAD21, SMC1A, SMC3, and SCC3 [ STAG1 (SA1) and STAG2 (SA2) in multicellular organisms] proteins, involved in sister chromatid cohesion.

== Discovery ==
rad21 was first cloned by Birkenbihl and Subramani in 1992 by complementing the radiation sensitivity of the rad21-45 mutant fission yeast, Schizosaccharomyces pombe, and the murine and human homologs of S. pombe rad21 were cloned by McKay, Troelstra, van der Spek, Kanaar, Smit, Hagemeijer, Bootsma and Hoeijmakers. The human RAD21 (hRAD21) gene is located on the long (q) arm of chromosome 8 at position 24.11 (8q24.11). In 1997, RAD21 was independently discovered by two groups to be a major component of the chromosomal cohesin complex, and its dissolution by the cysteine protease Separase at the metaphase to anaphase transition results in the separation of sister chromatids and chromosomal segregation.

== Structure ==
RAD21, belongs to a superfamily of eukaryotic and prokaryotic proteins called a-Kleisins, is a nuclear phospho-protein, ranges in size from 278aa in the house lizard (Gekko Japonicus) to 746aa in the killer whale (Orcinus Orca), with a median length of 631aa in most vertebrate species including humans. RAD21 proteins are most conserved at the N-terminus (NT) and C-terminus (CT), which bind to SMC3 and SMC1, respectively. The STAG domain in the middle of RAD21, which binds to SCC3 (SA1/SA2), is also conserved (Figure 1). These proteins have nuclear localization signals, an acidic-basic stretch and an acidic stretch (Figure 1), which is consistent with a chromatin-binding role. RAD21 is cleaved by several proteases including Separase and Calcium-dependent cysteine endopeptidase Calpain-1 during mitosis and Caspases during apoptosis.

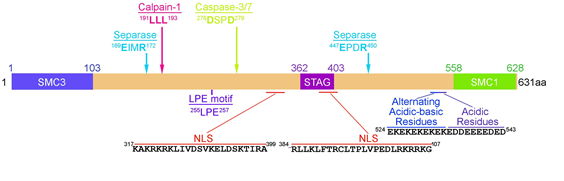
Figure 1 Characteristics on human RAD21. RAD21 has three binding domains that interact with corresponding protein: SMC3 (1–103aa), STAG1/2 (362–403aa) and SMC1A (558–628aa); a LPE motif (255-257aa): required for rapid and specific cleavage of RAD21 by Separase; two bipartite nuclear localization signals (NLS) (317-399aa and 384-407aa) predicted by cNLS Mapper; one alternating acidic-basic residues stretch (524-533aa); one acidic residues stretch (534-543aa); four cleavage sites: two Separase cleavage sites (ExxR), one Calpain-1 cleavage site (LLL) and one Caspase-3/7 site (DxxD). The numbers indicate the location of amino acid residue on human RAD21. The arrow shows the site where it is cleaved.

== Interactions ==
RAD21 binds to the V-shaped SMC1 and SMC3 heterodimer, forming a tripartite ring-like structure, and then recruits SCC3 (SA1/SA2). The 4 element-complex is called the cohesin complex (Figure 2). Currently, there are two major competing models of sister chromatid cohesion (Figure 2B). The first one is the one-ring embrace model, and the second one is the dimeric handcuff-model. The one-ring embrace model posits that a single cohesin ring traps two sister chromatids inside, while the two-ring handcuff model proposes trapping of each chromatid individually. According to the handcuff model, each ring has one set of RAD21, SMC1, and SMC3 molecules. The handcuff is established when two RAD21 molecules move into anti-parallel orientation that is enforced by either SA1 or SA2.

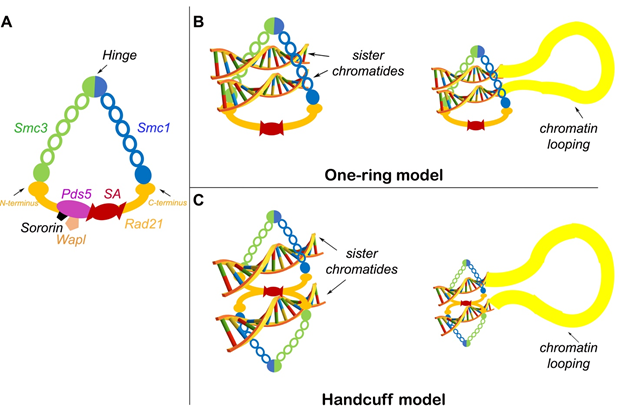
Figure 2 Cohesin complex and models. A. Cohesin is composed of four core structural subunits: RAD21, SMC1, SMC3, and a SA protein (SA1 or SA2). PDS5, WAPL, and Sororin are cohesin-associate proteins. Sororin has not been found in yeast. B. One-ring model. C. Handcuff model. Figure adapted with modifications from Zhang and Pati.

The N-terminal domain of RAD21 contains two α-helices that forms a three helical bundle with the coiled coil of SMC3. The central region of RAD21 is thought to be largely unstructured but contains several binding sites for regulators of cohesin. This includes a binding site for SA1 or SA2, recognition motifs for separase, caspase, and calpain to cleave, as well as a region that is competitively bound by PDS5A, PDS5B or NIPBL. The C-terminal domain of RAD21 forms a winged helix that binds two β-sheets in the Smc1 head domain.

WAPL releases cohesin from DNA by opening the SMC3-RAD21 interface thereby allowing DNA to pass out of the ring. Opening of this interface is regulated by ATP-binding by the SMC subunits. This causes the ATPase head domains to dimerise and deforms the coiled coil of SMC3 therefore disrupting the binding of RAD21 to the coiled coil.

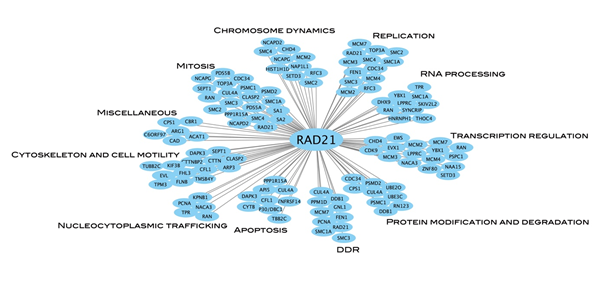
Figure 3 Functional classification of RAD21 interactors. Fig output by Cytoscape with the data retrieved from Panigrahi et al. 2012. Network nodes represent proteins. Edges represent protein-protein associations, clustered in different cellular processes.

A total of 285 RAD21-interactants have been reported that function in wide range of cellular processes, including mitosis, regulation of apoptosis, chromosome dynamics, chromosomal cohesion, replication, transcription regulation, RNA processing, DNA damage response, protein modification and degradation, and cytoskeleton and cell motility (Figure 3).

== Function ==
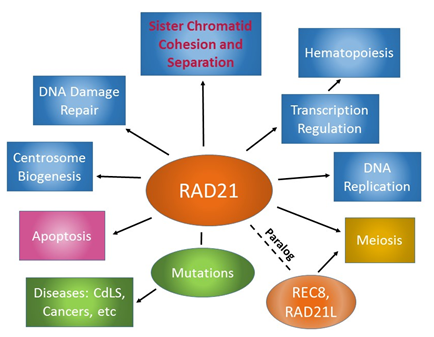
Figure 4 RAD21 Functions in various cellular processes. RAD21 forms cohesin complex with SMC1, SMC3 and STAG1/2 to function in various normal cellular processes (shown in blue). The canonical role of Rad21 is sister chromatid cohesion and separation. Other roles include DNA damage repair, transcription regulation, DNA replication, and centrosome biogenesis, etc. Diseases rise when mutations in RAD21 disrupt its function (in green). Caspase-cleaved Rad21 fragment promotes apoptosis (in purple). REC8 and RAD21L are paralogs of RAD21 in vertebrate, which function specifically to meiosis (in brown).

RAD21 plays multiple physiological roles in diverse cellular functions (Figure 4). As a subunit of the cohesin complex, RAD21 is involved in sister chromatid cohesion from the time of DNA replication in S phase to their segregation in mitosis, a function that is evolutionarily conserved and essential for proper chromosome segregation, chromosomal architecture, post-replicative DNA repair, and the prevention of inappropriate recombination between repetitive regions. RAD21 may also play a role in spindle pole assembly during mitosis and progression of apoptosis. In interphase, cohesin may function in the control of gene expression by binding to numerous sites within the genome. As a structural component of the cohesin complex, RAD21 also contributes to various chromatin-associated functions, including DNA replication, DNA damage response (DDR), and most importantly, transcriptional regulation. Numerous recent functional and genomic studies have implicated chromosomal cohesin proteins as critical regulators of hematopoietic gene expression.

As a part of cohesin complex, functions of Rad21 in the regulation of gene expression include: 1) allele-specific transcription by interacting with the boundary element CCCTC-binding factor (CTCF), 2) tissue-specific transcription by interacting with tissue-specific transcription factors, 3) general progression of transcription by communicating with the basal transcription machinery, and 4) RAD21 co-localization with CTCF-independent pluripotency factors (Oct4, Nanog, Sox4, and KLF2). RAD21 cooperates with CTCF, tissue-specific transcription factors, and basal transcription machinery to regulate transcription dynamically. Also, to effectuate proper transcription activation, cohesin loops chromatin to bring two distant regions together. Cohesin may also act as a transcription insulator to ensure repression. Thus, RAD21 can affect both activation and repression of transcription. Enhancers that promote transcription and insulators that block transcription are located in conserved regulatory elements (CREs) on chromosomes, and cohesins are thought to physically connect distant CREs with gene promoters in a cell-type specific manner to modulate transcriptional outcome.

In meiosis, REC8 is expressed and replaces RAD21 in the cohesin complex. REC8-containing cohesin generates cohesion between homologous chromosomes and sister chromatids which can persist for years in the case of mammalian oocytes. RAD21L is a further paralog of RAD21 that has a role in meiotic chromosome segregation. The major role of Rad21L cohesin complex is in homologue pairing and synapsis, not in sister chromatid cohesion, whereas Rec8 most likely functions in sister chromatid cohesion. Intriguingly, concomitantly with the disappearance of RAD21L, Rad21 appears on the chromosomes in late pachytene and mostly dissociates after diplotene onward. The function of Rad21 cohesin that transiently appears in late prophase I is unclear.

Germline heterozygous or homozygous missense mutations in RAD21 have been associated with human genetic disorders, including developmental diseases such as Cornelia de Lange syndrome and chronic intestinal pseudo-obstruction called Mungan syndrome, respectively, and collectively termed as cohesinopathies. Somatic mutations and amplification of the RAD21 have also been widely reported in both human solid and hematopoietic tumors.
