= PDS5A =

Protein-coding gene in the species Homo sapiens

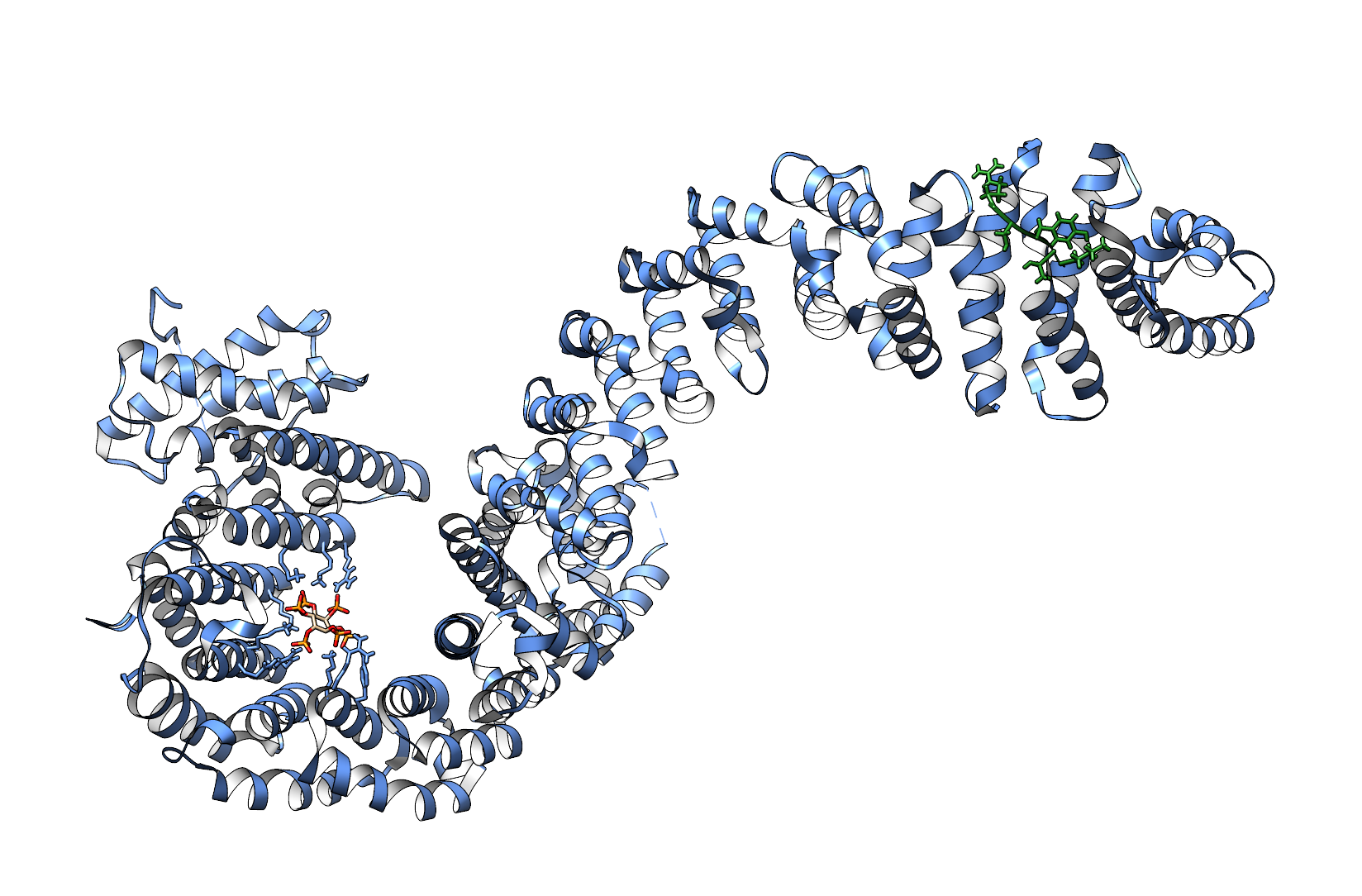

Identifiers
- Aliases: PDS5A, SCC-112, SCC112, PIG54, PDS5 cohesin associated factor A
- External IDs: OMIM: 613200; MGI: 1918771; GeneCards: PDS5A

Gene location (Human)
Chr.	Chromosome 4 (human)
Band	4p14	Start	39,822,863 bp
Band	4p14	End	39,977,956 bp

Gene location (Mouse)
Chr.	Chromosome 5 (mouse)
Band	5|5 C3.1	Start	65,763,064 bp
Band	5|5 C3.1	End	65,855,616 bp
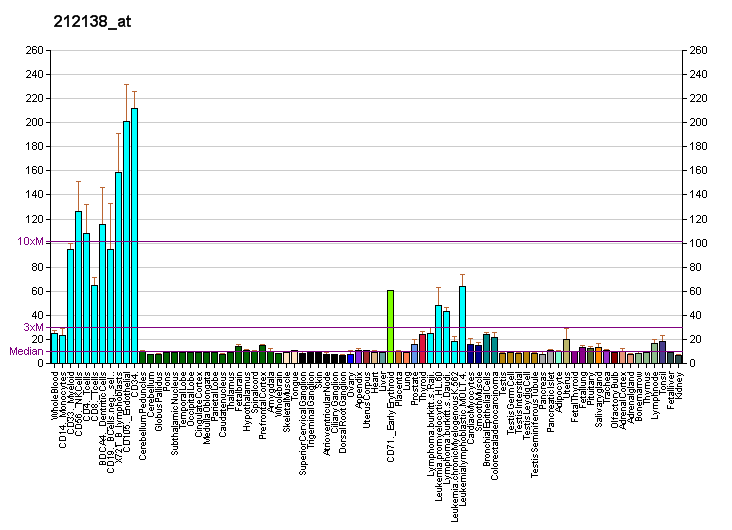

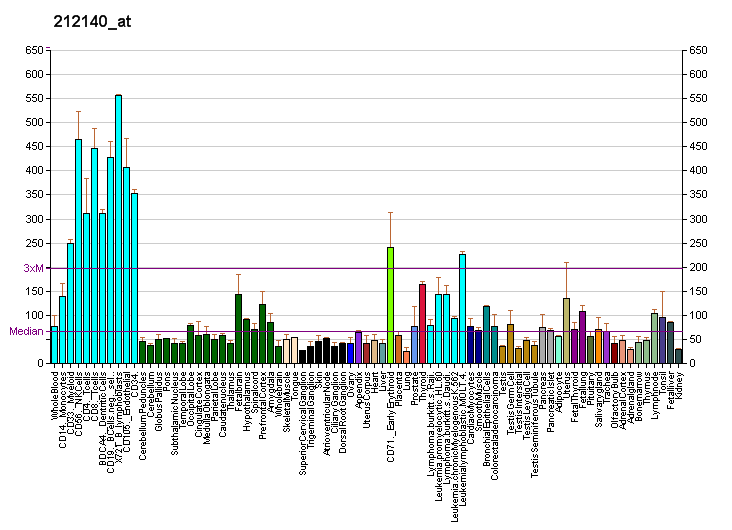

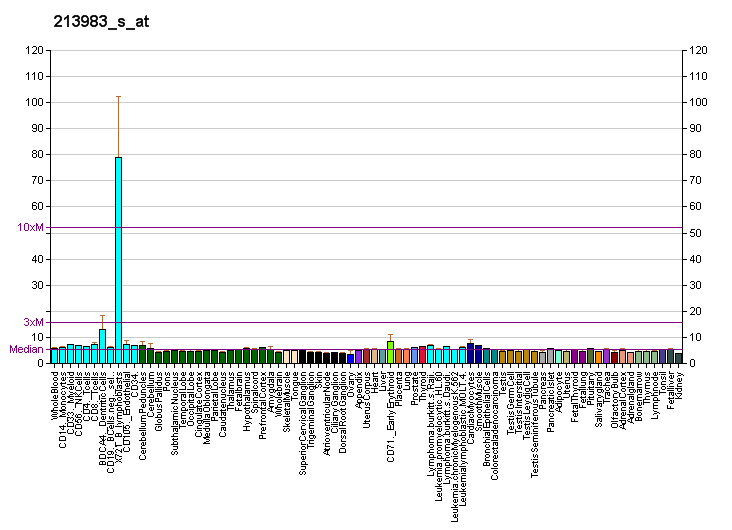
RNA expression pattern
Bgee	Human / Mouse (ortholog); Top expressed in: germinal epithelium; epithelium of nasopharynx; Achilles tendon; tonsil; gingival epithelium; epithelium of colon; Epithelium of choroid plexus; cartilage tissue; seminal vesicula; bone marrow cell / Top expressed in: tail of embryo; genital tubercle; ventricular zone; epiblast; primitive streak; thymus; lacrimal gland; cumulus cell; renal corpuscle; Paneth cell; More reference expression data
BioGPS	More reference expression data
Gene ontology
Molecular function	protein binding
Cellular component	cytosol; chromatin; plasma membrane; chromosome, centromeric region; nucleoplasm; chromosome; nucleus
Biological process	cell division; cell cycle; negative regulation of DNA replication; mitotic sister chromatid cohesion; DNA repair
Sources:Amigo / QuickGO
Orthologs
Databases	NCBI: entry; OMA: entry
Species	Human	Mouse
Entrez	23244	71521
Ensembl	ENSG00000121892	ENSMUSG00000029202
UniProt	Q29RF7	Q6A026
RefSeq (mRNA)	NM_001100399; NM_001100400; NM_015200	NM_001081321; NM_027818
RefSeq (protein)	NP_001093869; NP_001093870	n/a
Location (UCSC)	Chr 4: 39.82 – 39.98 Mb	Chr 5: 65.76 – 65.86 Mb
PubMed search
- Wikidata
View/Edit Human	View/Edit Mouse

Sister chromatid cohesion protein PDS5 homolog A is a protein that in humans is encoded by the PDS5A gene.
