= SMC1A =

Protein-coding gene in humans

Identifiers
- Aliases: SMC1A, CDLS2, DXS423E, SB1.8, SMC1, SMC1L1, SMC1alpha, SMCB, structural maintenance of chromosomes 1A, EIEE85, DEE85
- External IDs: OMIM: 300040; MGI: 1344345; GeneCards: SMC1A
Available structures
PDB	Ortholog search: Q68EN4 PDBe Q68EN4 RCSB
PDB	List of PDB id codes 2WD5

Gene location (Human)
Chr.	X chromosome (human)
Band	Xp11.22	Start	53,374,149 bp
Band	Xp11.22	End	53,422,728 bp

Gene location (Mouse)
Chr.	X chromosome (mouse)
Band	X|X F3	Start	150,799,424 bp
Band	X|X F3	End	150,845,690 bp
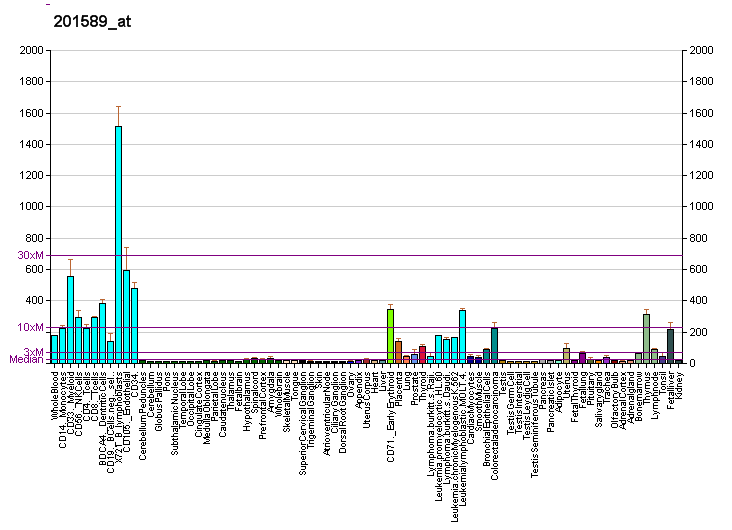

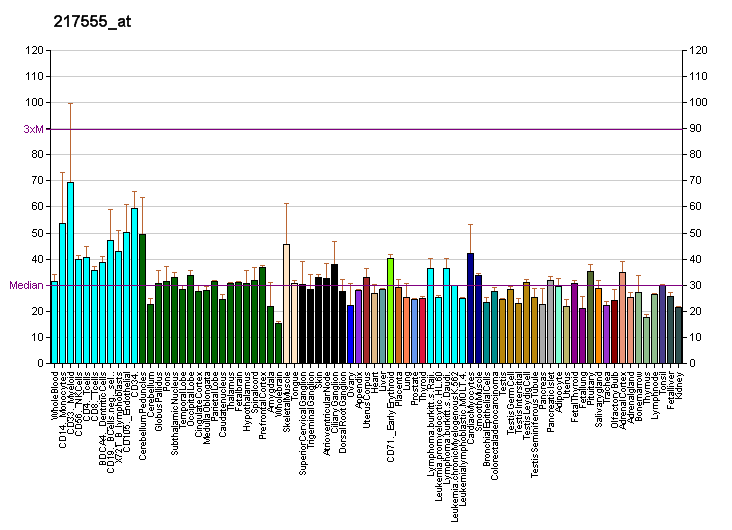
RNA expression pattern
Bgee	Human / Mouse (ortholog); Top expressed in: sural nerve; trabecular bone; embryo; tendon of biceps brachii; jejunal mucosa; germinal epithelium; ventricular zone; mucosa of sigmoid colon; tibia; Achilles tendon / Top expressed in: genital tubercle; Rostral migratory stream; tail of embryo; neural layer of retina; fetal liver hematopoietic progenitor cell; ventricular zone; external carotid artery; internal carotid artery; dermis; maxillary prominence; More reference expression data
BioGPS	More reference expression data
Gene ontology
Molecular function	nucleotide binding; mediator complex binding; chromatin binding; protein binding; protein heterodimerization activity; ATP binding; RNA binding; protein-containing complex binding
Cellular component	meiotic cohesin complex; chromosome; nucleoplasm; condensed nuclear chromosome; chromosome, centromeric region; nucleus; kinetochore; cytosol; cohesin complex; nuclear matrix; mitotic spindle pole
Biological process	chromosome organization; cellular response to DNA damage stimulus; stem cell population maintenance; cell division; negative regulation of DNA endoreduplication; mitotic sister chromatid cohesion; mitotic sister chromatid segregation; cell cycle; response to radiation; DNA repair; sister chromatid cohesion; response to DNA damage checkpoint signaling; meiosis; regulation of mitotic spindle assembly
Sources:Amigo / QuickGO
Orthologs
Databases	NCBI: entry; OMA: entry
Species	Human	Mouse
Entrez	8243	24061
Ensembl	ENSG00000072501	ENSMUSG00000041133
UniProt	Q14683	Q9CU62
RefSeq (mRNA)	NM_006306; NM_001281463	NM_019710
RefSeq (protein)	NP_001268392; NP_006297; NP_006297.2	NP_062684
Location (UCSC)	Chr X: 53.37 – 53.42 Mb	Chr X: 150.8 – 150.85 Mb
PubMed search
- Wikidata
View/Edit Human	View/Edit Mouse

Structural maintenance of chromosomes protein 1A (SMC1A) is a protein that in humans is encoded by the SMC1A gene. SMC1A is a subunit of the cohesin complex which mediates sister chromatid cohesion, homologous recombination and DNA looping. In somatic cells, cohesin is formed of SMC1A, SMC3, RAD21 and either SA1 or SA2 whereas in meiosis, cohesin is formed of SMC3, SMC1B, REC8 and SA3.

SMC1A is a member of the SMC protein family. Members of this family are key regulators of DNA repair, chromosome condensation and chromosome segregation from bacteria to humans.

== Structure ==
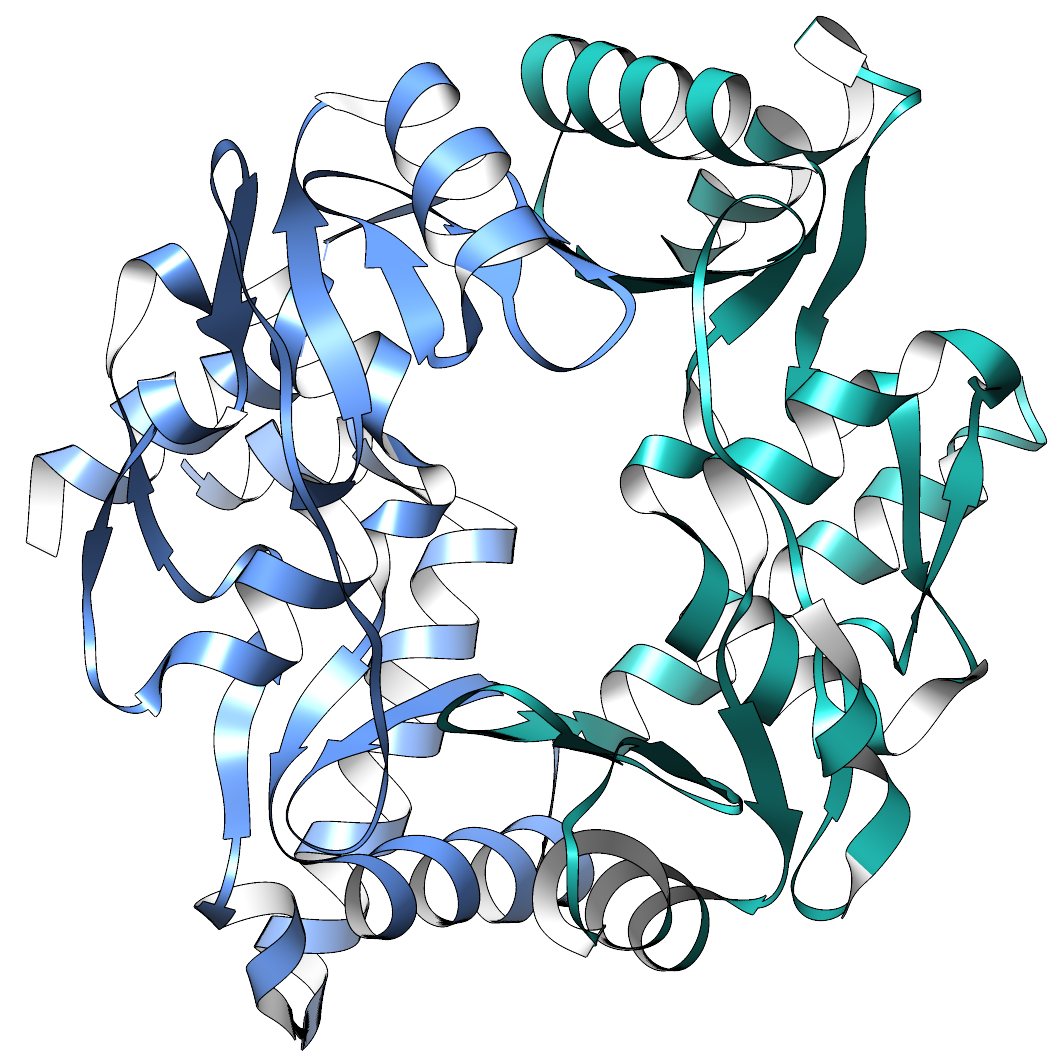
Structure of the interface between SMC3 (blue) and SMC1 (green) (PDB 2WD5) from mice (Kurze et al. 2009)

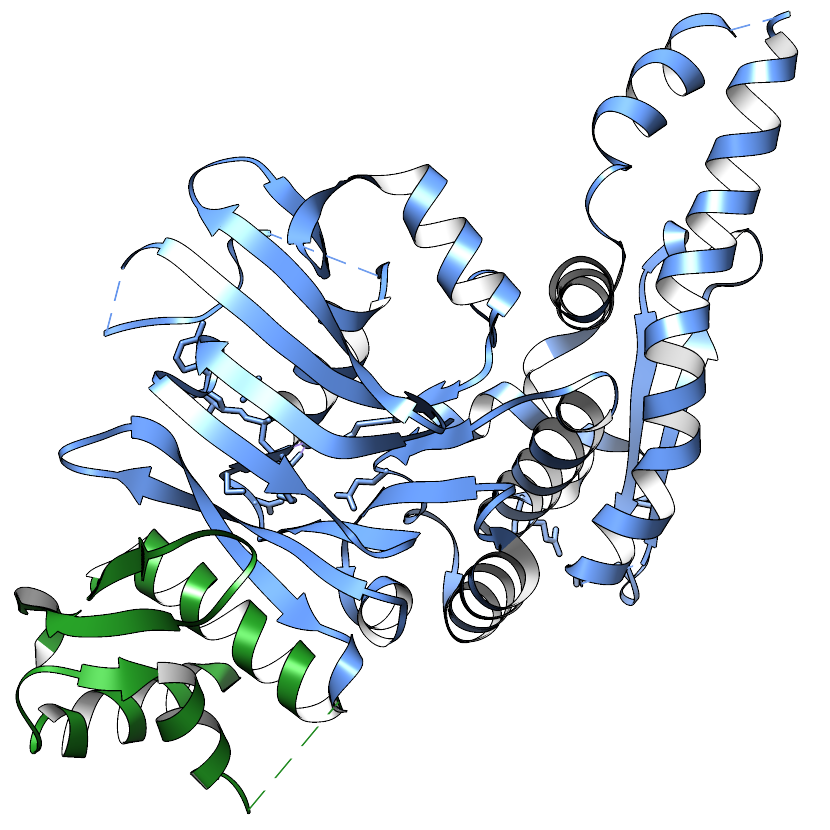
Structure of the interface between SMC1 (blue) and RAD21 (green) (PDB 1W1W) from budding yeast (Haering et al. 2004)

The domain organisation of SMC proteins is highly conserved and is composed of an N-terminal Walker A motif, coiled-coil, "hinge", coiled-coil and a C-terminal Walker B motif. The protein folds back on itself to form a rod-shaped molecule with a heterodimerisation "hinge" domain at one end and an ABC-type ATPase "head" at the other. These globular domains are separated by a ~50 nm anti-parallel coiled-coil. SMC3 and SMC1 bind via their hinge domains creating V-shaped heterodimers. The N-terminal domain of RAD21 binds to the coiled coil of SMC3 just above the head domain while the C-terminal domain of RAD21 binds the head domain of SMC1. This end to end binding of the SMC3-SMC1-RAD21 trimer creates a closed ring within which DNA can be entrapped.

== Function ==
In addition to entrapping DNA to ensure proper chromosome segregation during the cell cycle, SMC1A, as a component of cohesin, contributes to facilitating inter-chromatid contacts mediating distant-element interactions and to creating chromosome domains called topologically associating domains (TADs). It has been proposed that cohesin promotes the interaction between enhancers and promoters for regulating gene transcription regulation. The removal of cohesin triggers abnormal TAD topology because loops spanning multiple compartment intervals lead to mixing among loci in different compartments As a consequence, loop loss causes gene expression dysregulation. SMC1A also plays a role in spindle pole formation. In fact, in association with SMC3, it is recruited to mitotic spindle poles through interaction with RAE1. The dysregulation of SMC1A (both down- and up-regulation) causes aberrant multi-polar spindles, suggesting that cohesin would function to hold microtubules at the spindle pole. Proper cohesion of sister chromatids is a prerequisite for the correct segregation of chromosomes during cell division. The cohesin multiprotein complex is required for sister chromatid cohesion. This complex is composed partly of two structural maintenance of chromosomes (SMC) proteins, SMC3 and either SMC1L2 or the protein encoded by this gene. Most of the cohesin complexes dissociate from the chromosomes before mitosis, although those complexes at the kinetochore remain. Therefore, the encoded protein is thought to be an important part of functional kinetochores. In addition, this protein interacts with BRCA1 and is phosphorylated by ATM, indicating a potential role for this protein in DNA repair. This gene, which belongs to the SMC gene family, is located in an area of the X-chromosome that escapes X inactivation.

== Clinical significance ==
=== Cornelia de Lange syndrome ===
Cornelia de Lange syndrome (CdLS) is a rare genetic disorder that presents with variable clinical abnormalities including dysmorphic features, severe growth retardation, global developmental delay, and intellectual disability. The frequency varies from 1:10 000 to 1:30 000 live births without differences between ethnic groups. SMC1A is one of five genes that have been implicated in CdLS. Pathogenic variants in SMC1A, missense and small in frame deletions, are associated with CdLS. SMC1A variants, which maintain the frame of their encoded proteins, are associated with milder CdLS phenotypes with moderate neurocognitive disability and a paucity of major structural defects. The phenotype of SMC1A affected males is more severe than that of mutated females. Since SMC1A escapes X inactivation, it has been hypothesized that the mechanism in affected females is the dominant-negative effect of the mutated protein.

=== Genome instability and cancer ===
SMC1A also takes part in DNA repair. The down-regulation of SMC1A causes genome instability, and CdLS cells carrying SMC1A variants display high level of chromosome aberrations. Furthermore, SMC1A is phosphorylated on Ser957 and Ser966 residues by ATM and ATR threonine/serine kinases following DNA damage induced by chemical treatment or ionizing radiation. It has been hypothesized that the Breast cancer type 1 susceptibility (BRCA1) gene collaborates in phosphorylating SMC1A, which is required for activation of the S-phase checkpoint allowing blocking of the cell cycle and the repair of DNA. SMC1A variants have been identified in blood, brain, bladder, and colon cancer. SMC1A plays a pivotal role in colorectal tumorigenesis. Indeed, colorectal tissue acquires extra-copies of SMC1A during cancer development and its expression is significantly stronger in carcinomas than in normal mucosa and early adenoma. Finally, the up-regulation of SMC1A is thought to be a predictor of poor prognosis in colorectal cancer.
