= SMC3 =

Protein-coding gene in humans

Identifiers
- Aliases: SMC3, BAM, BMH, CDLS3, CSPG6, HCAP, SMC3L1, structural maintenance of chromosomes 3
- External IDs: OMIM: 606062; MGI: 1339795; GeneCards: SMC3
Available structures
PDB	Ortholog search: PDBe RCSB
PDB	List of PDB id codes 2WD5

Gene location (Human)
Chr.	Chromosome 10 (human)
Band	10q25.2	Start	110,567,684 bp
Band	10q25.2	End	110,606,048 bp

Gene location (Mouse)
Chr.	Chromosome 19 (mouse)
Band	19|19 D2	Start	53,588,829 bp
Band	19|19 D2	End	53,634,264 bp
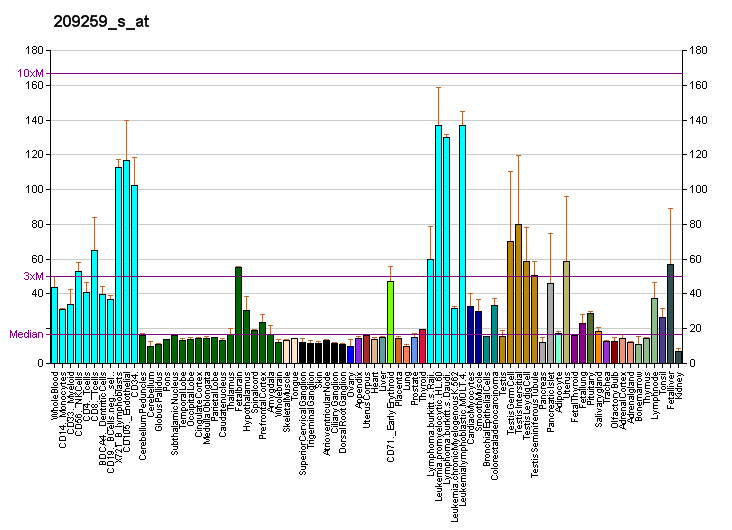

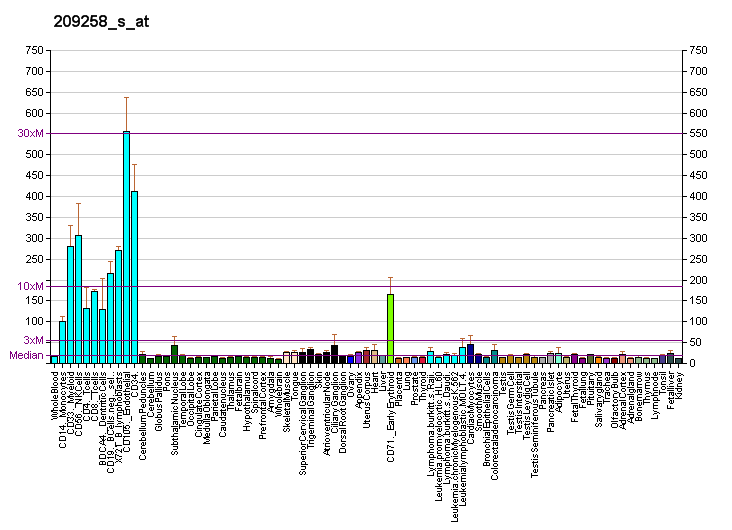

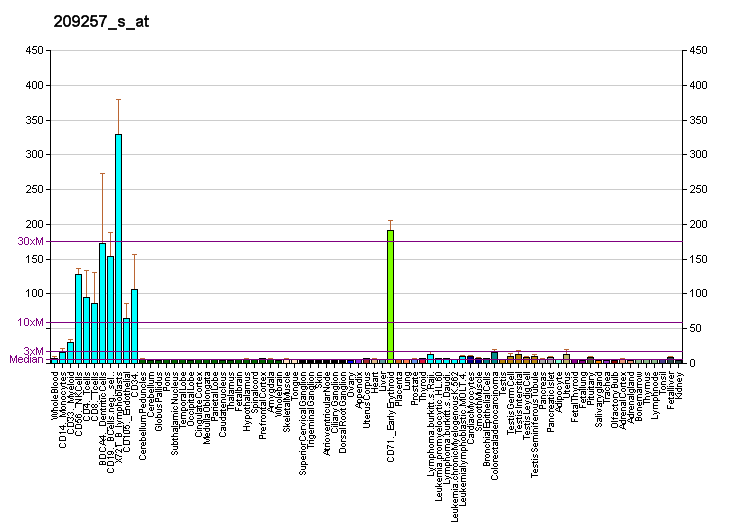
RNA expression pattern
Bgee	Human / Mouse (ortholog); Top expressed in: tendon of biceps brachii; ventricular zone; oocyte; testicle; gonad; ganglionic eminence; internal globus pallidus; Achilles tendon; secondary oocyte; superior surface of tongue / Top expressed in: genital tubercle; tail of embryo; fetal liver hematopoietic progenitor cell; ventricular zone; mandibular prominence; maxillary prominence; epiblast; hand; secondary oocyte; somite; More reference expression data
BioGPS	More reference expression data
Gene ontology
Molecular function	microtubule motor activity; nucleotide binding; mediator complex binding; chromatin binding; protein binding; protein heterodimerization activity; ATP binding; dynein complex binding; beta-tubulin binding; protein-containing complex binding
Cellular component	cytosol; meiotic cohesin complex; nuclear matrix; chromosome; nucleoplasm; lateral element; chromatin; chromosome, centromeric region; nucleus; basement membrane; intracellular anatomical structure; cohesin complex; mitotic spindle pole
Biological process	regulation of DNA replication; chromosome organization; cellular response to DNA damage stimulus; stem cell population maintenance; cell division; negative regulation of DNA endoreduplication; cell cycle; DNA repair; sister chromatid cohesion; mitotic cell cycle; meiosis; regulation of mitotic spindle assembly
Sources:Amigo / QuickGO
Orthologs
Databases	NCBI: entry; OMA: entry
Species	Human	Mouse
Entrez	9126	13006
Ensembl	ENSG00000108055	ENSMUSG00000024974
UniProt	Q9UQE7	Q9CW03
RefSeq (mRNA)	NM_005445	NM_007790
RefSeq (protein)	NP_005436	NP_031816
Location (UCSC)	Chr 10: 110.57 – 110.61 Mb	Chr 19: 53.59 – 53.63 Mb
PubMed search
- Wikidata
View/Edit Human	View/Edit Mouse

Structural maintenance of chromosomes protein 3 (SMC3) is a protein that in humans is encoded by the SMC3 gene. SMC3 is a subunit of the Cohesin complex which mediates sister chromatid cohesion, homologous recombination and DNA looping. Cohesin is formed of SMC3, SMC1, RAD21 and either SA1 or SA2. In humans, SMC3 is present in all cohesin complexes whereas there are multiple paralogs for the other subunits.

SMC3 is a member of the SMC protein family. Members of this family are key regulators of DNA repair, chromosome condensation and chromosome segregation.

== Structure and interactions ==
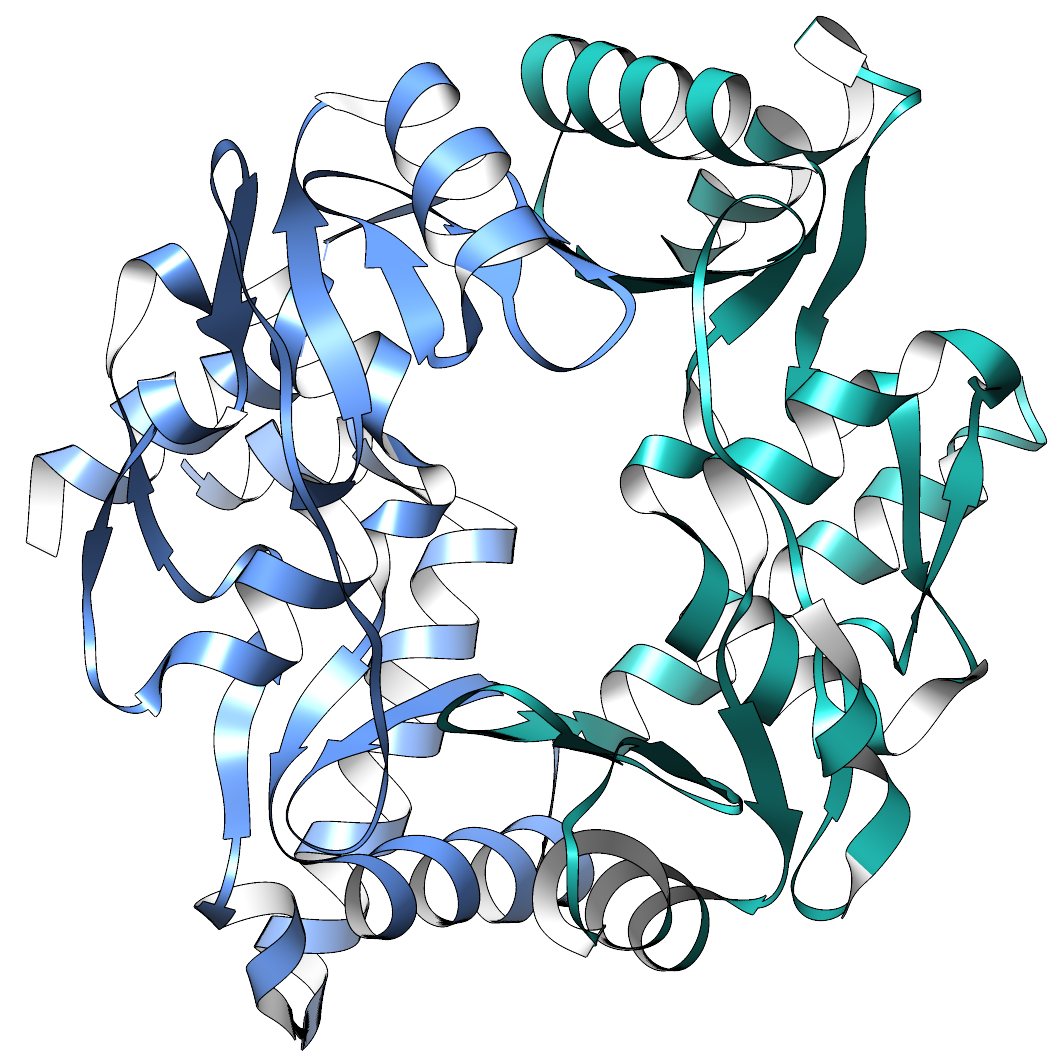
Structure of the interface between SMC3 (blue) and SMC1 (green) (PDB 2WD5) from mice (Kurze et al., 2009)

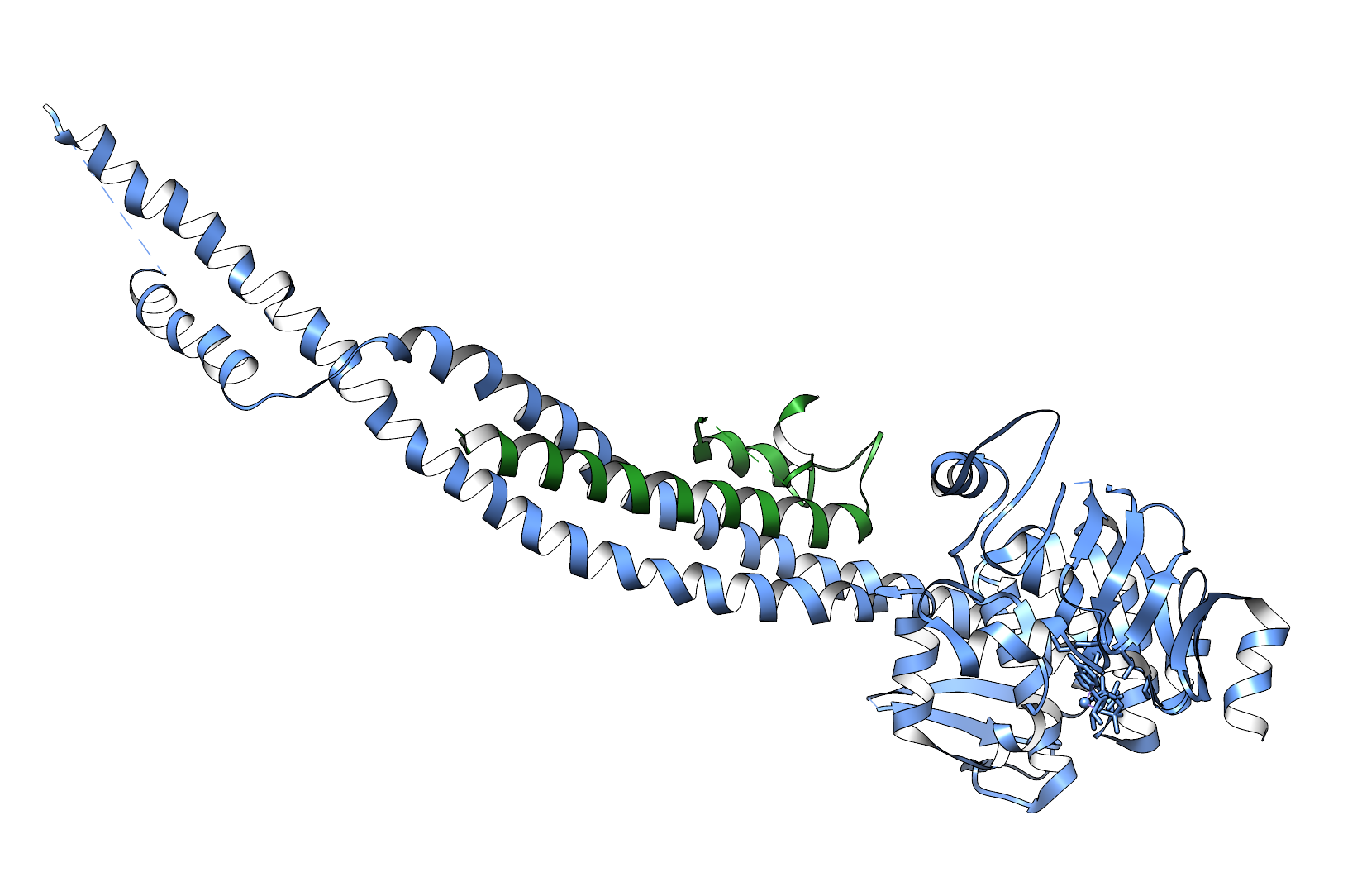
Structure of the interface between SMC3 (blue) and RAD21 (green) (PDB 4UX3) from budding yeast (Gligoris et al., 2014)

The domain organisation of SMC proteins is evolutionarily conserved and is composed of an N-terminal Walker A motif, coiled-coil, "hinge", coiled-coil and a C-terminal Walker B motif. The protein folds back on itself to form a rod-shaped molecule with a heterodimerisation "hinge" domain at one end and an ABC-type ATPase "head" at the other. These globular domains are separated by a ~50 nm anti-parallel coiled-coil. SMC3 and SMC1 bind via their hinge domains creating V-shaped heterodimers. The N-terminal domain of RAD21 binds to the coiled coil of SMC3 just above the head domain while the C-terminal domain of RAD21 binds the head domain of SMC1. This end to end binding of the SMC3-SMC1-RAD21 trimer creates a closed ring within which DNA can be entrapped. SA1 or

When DNA is replicated and sister chromatid cohesion is established SMC3 is acetylated on a pair of highly conserved lysines by ESCO1 and ESCO2. In budding yeast this modification is sufficient to stabilise cohesin on the DNA until mitosis but in animals, binding of sororin is also required.

During meiosis, SMC3 forms cohesin complexes with SMC1ß, STAG3 and REC8 which generate cohesion between homologous chromosomes and sister chromatids.

== Cornelia de Lange syndrome ==
Cornelia de Lange syndrome (CdLS) is a rare genetic disorder that presents with variable clinical abnormalities including dysmorphic features, severe growth retardation, global developmental delay, and intellectual disability. SMC3 is one of five genes that have been implicated in CdLS. In one case report, a novel SMC3 gene duplication was detected in a child with failure to thrive, hypotonia and facial dysmorphic features of CdLS. The same duplication was also observed in the mother, who had milder dysmorphic facies.

== Role in Basement Membrane ==
SMC3 occurs in certain cell types as a secreted protein and post-translational addition of chondroitin sulfate chains gives rise to the secreted proteoglycan bamacan, an abundant basement membrane protein.
