= STAG1 =

Protein-coding gene in the species Homo sapiens

Identifiers
- Aliases: STAG1, SA1, SCC3A, stromal antigen 1, MRD47
- External IDs: OMIM: 604358; MGI: 1098658; GeneCards: STAG1

Gene location (Human)
Chr.	Chromosome 3 (human)
Band	3q22.3	Start	136,336,236 bp
Band	3q22.3	End	136,752,403 bp

Gene location (Mouse)
Chr.	Chromosome 9 (mouse)
Band	9|9 E3.3- E4	Start	100,479,851 bp
Band	9|9 E3.3- E4	End	100,841,428 bp
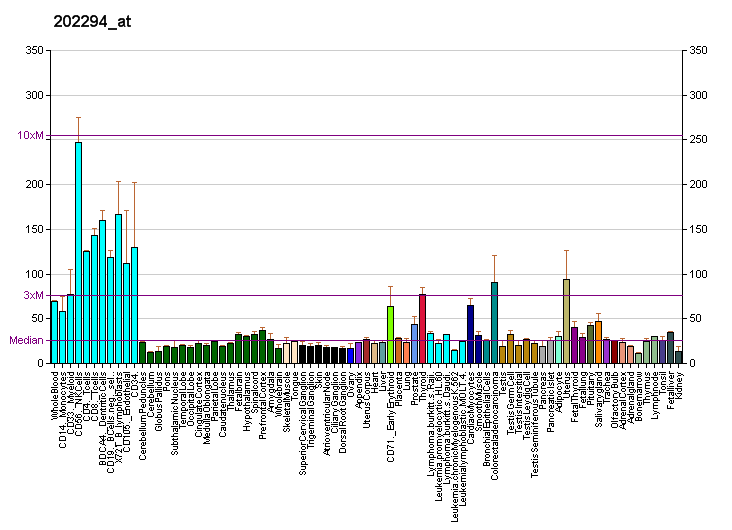

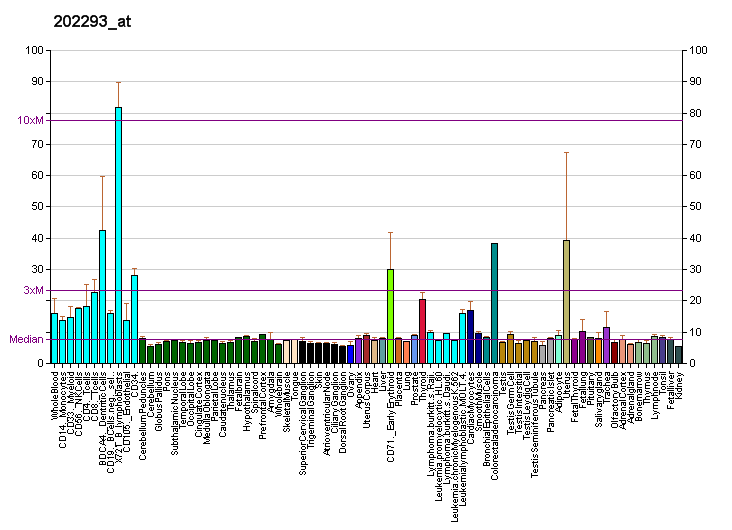
RNA expression pattern
Bgee	Human / Mouse (ortholog); Top expressed in: Achilles tendon; parotid gland; sural nerve; ventricular zone; synovial joint; Skeletal muscle tissue of rectus abdominis; tail of epididymis; ganglionic eminence; pericardium; superficial temporal artery / Top expressed in: tail of embryo; genital tubercle; ureter; ventricular zone; Gonadal ridge; medial ganglionic eminence; cumulus cell; spermatocyte; abdominal wall; maxillary prominence; More reference expression data
BioGPS	More reference expression data
Gene ontology
Molecular function	DNA-binding transcription activator activity, RNA polymerase II-specific; chromatin binding; protein binding
Cellular component	chromosome; cytosol; chromatin; chromosome, centromeric region; nucleus; nucleoplasm; nuclear body; cohesin complex; nuclear matrix; mitotic spindle pole
Biological process	chromosome segregation; cell division; cell cycle; transcription by RNA polymerase II; positive regulation of transcription by RNA polymerase II; regulation of mitotic spindle assembly; sister chromatid cohesion
Sources:Amigo / QuickGO
Orthologs
Databases	NCBI: entry; OMA: entry
Species	Human	Mouse
Entrez	10274	20842
Ensembl	ENSG00000118007	ENSMUSG00000037286
UniProt	Q8WVM7	Q9D3E6
RefSeq (mRNA)	NM_005862	NM_009282; NM_001357264; NM_001357265
RefSeq (protein)	NP_005853	NP_033308; NP_001344193; NP_001344194
Location (UCSC)	Chr 3: 136.34 – 136.75 Mb	Chr 9: 100.48 – 100.84 Mb
PubMed search
- Wikidata
View/Edit Human	View/Edit Mouse

Cohesin subunit SA-1 (SA1) is a protein that in humans is encoded by the STAG1 gene. SA1 is a subunit of the Cohesin complex which mediates sister chromatid cohesion, homologous recombination and DNA looping. In somatic cells cohesin is formed of SMC3, SMC1, RAD21 and either SA1 or SA2 whereas in meiosis, cohesin is formed of SMC3, SMC1B, REC8 and SA3. There is a nonprofit community formed for those with a STAG1 Gene mutation at www.stag1gene.org.

== Structure ==
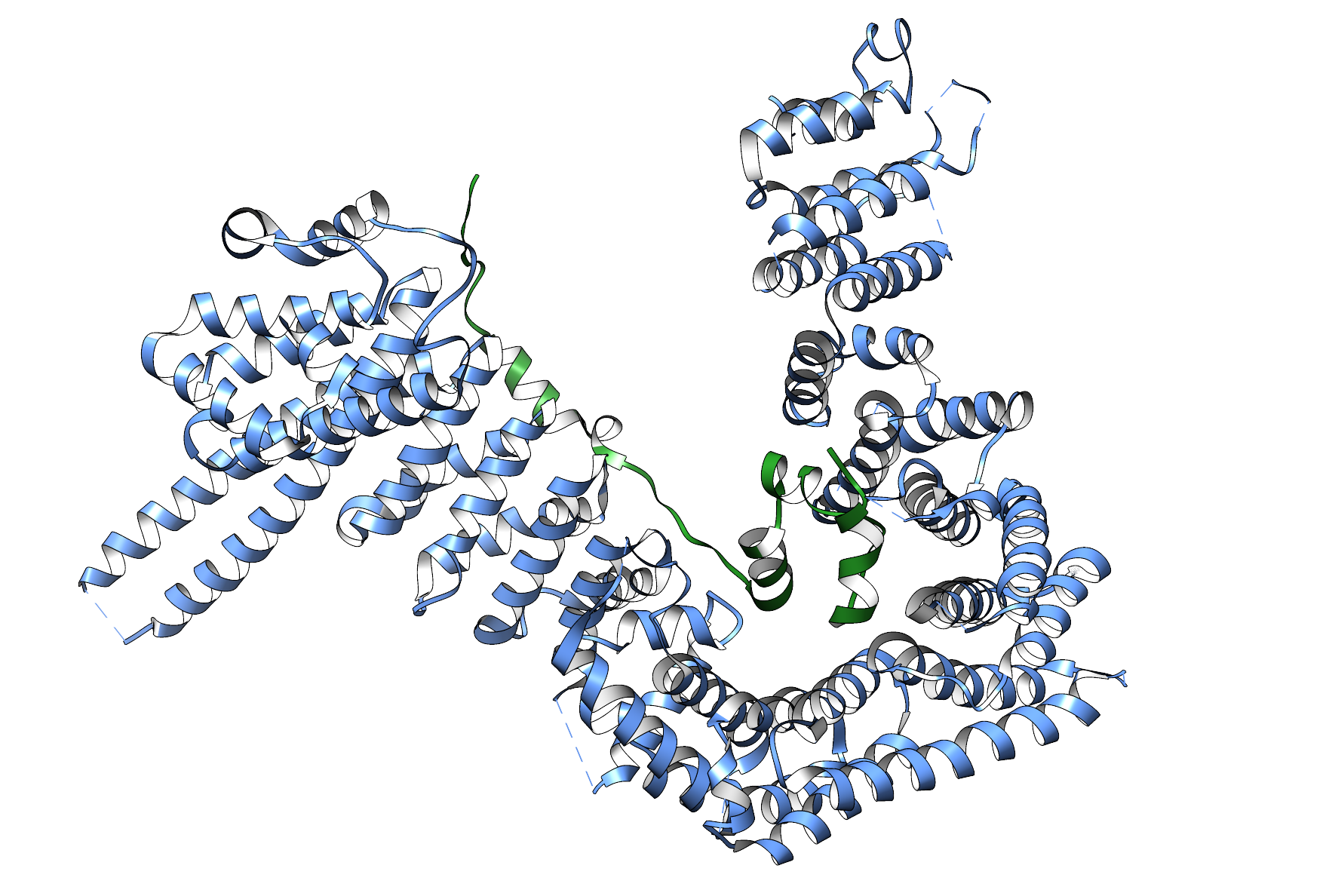
Structure of SA2 (blue) and RAD21 (green) (PDB 4PK7)

SA1 is one of three human homologues of the yeast protein Scc3 which is a core subunit of the cohesin complex (the three human paralogues are SA1, SA2 and SA3). SA1 and SA2 are expressed in somatic cells whereas SA3 is the main SA paralogue in meiotic cells. In humans, SA2 has been shown to be more abundant than SA1; however, in other cell types, SA1 is the dominant form.

SA1 stably binds to cohesin via the RAD21 subunit and functions as a platform for other regulatory subunits. The sequences of SA1 and SA2 are 75% conserved. They demonstrate a distinction between the N-terminal region and the C-terminal region. SA1 has an evident AT-hook at the N-terminal region.

== Function ==
SA1 has roles in regulating both cohesin loading and release. SA1 functions specifically in telomere cohesion.

In mice, SA1 is required for embryonic development and has been shown to be lethal if not expressed.
