= NIPBL =

Protein-coding gene in the species Homo sapiens

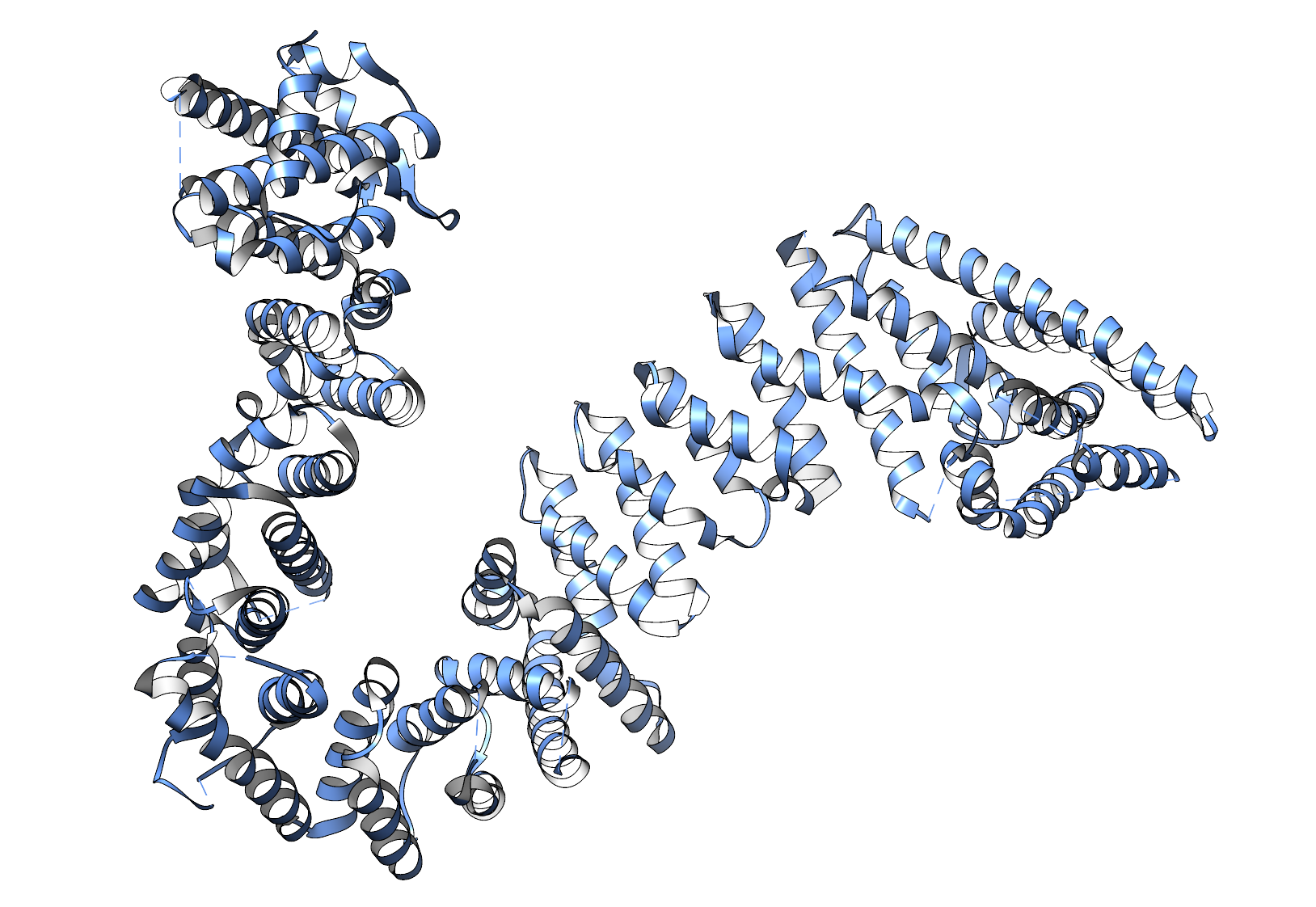

Identifiers
- Aliases: NIPBL, CDLS, CDLS1, IDN3, IDN3-B, Scc2, cohesin loading factor, NIPBL cohesin loading factor
- External IDs: OMIM: 608667; MGI: 1913976; GeneCards: NIPBL

Gene location (Human)
| Chr. | Chromosome 5 (human) |
| Band | 5p13.2 | Start | 36,876,769 bp |
| Band | 5p13.2 | End | 37,066,413 bp |

Gene location (Mouse)
| Chr. | Chromosome 15 (mouse) |
| Band | 15|15 A1 | Start | 8,320,101 bp |
| Band | 15|15 A1 | End | 8,473,947 bp |
RNA expression pattern
| Bgee | Human / Mouse (ortholog); Top expressed in: testicle; Achilles tendon; epithelium of colon; ventricular zone; ganglionic eminence; gonad; pancreatic ductal cell; internal globus pallidus; sural nerve; tendon of biceps brachii / Top expressed in: Rostral migratory stream; internal carotid artery; maxillary prominence; external carotid artery; Paneth cell; human fetus; lacrimal gland; mandibular prominence; seminiferous tubule; hair follicle; More reference expression data |
| BioGPS | n/a |
Gene ontology
| Molecular function | mediator complex binding; chromo shadow domain binding; protein N-terminus binding; histone deacetylase binding; chromatin binding; protein C-terminus binding; protein binding |
| Cellular component | SMC loading complex; nucleoplasm; chromatin; extracellular exosome; nucleus; integrator complex; nuclear chromosome; chromosome; Scc2-Scc4 cohesin loading complex |
| Biological process | positive regulation of histone deacetylation; forelimb morphogenesis; eye morphogenesis; regulation of embryonic development; cognition; uterus morphogenesis; cellular response to X-ray; regulation of developmental growth; heart morphogenesis; outflow tract morphogenesis; positive regulation of ossification; negative regulation of transcription by RNA polymerase II; hearing; cellular response to DNA damage stimulus; stem cell population maintenance; ear morphogenesis; development of the heart; brain development; developmental growth; external genitalia morphogenesis; regulation of hair cycle; positive regulation of multicellular organism growth; embryonic digestive tract morphogenesis; gall bladder development; regulation of gene expression; embryonic cranial skeleton morphogenesis; embryonic viscerocranium morphogenesis; cell cycle; metanephros development; negative regulation of transcription, DNA-templated; fat cell differentiation; maintenance of mitotic sister chromatid cohesion; embryonic forelimb morphogenesis; face morphogenesis; positive regulation of transcription by RNA polymerase II; regulation of transcription by RNA polymerase II; positive regulation of neuron migration; transcription, DNA-templated; regulation of transcription, DNA-templated; multicellular organism development; mitotic sister chromatid cohesion; double-strand break repair; mitotic chromosome condensation; establishment of mitotic sister chromatid cohesion; rDNA condensation; establishment of protein localization to chromatin; cohesin loading; positive regulation of mitotic cohesin loading; replication-born double-strand break repair via sister chromatid exchange |
Sources:Amigo / QuickGO
Orthologs
| Databases | NCBI: entry; OMA: entry |
| Species | Human | Mouse |
| Entrez | 25836 | 71175 |
| Ensembl | ENSG00000164190 | ENSMUSG00000022141 |
| UniProt | Q6KC79 | Q6KCD5 |
| RefSeq (mRNA) | NM_015384; NM_133433 | NM_027707; NM_201232 |
| RefSeq (protein) | NP_056199; NP_597677 | NP_081983; NP_957684 |
| Location (UCSC) | Chr 5: 36.88 – 37.07 Mb | Chr 15: 8.32 – 8.47 Mb |
| PubMed search |
- Wikidata
| View/Edit Human | View/Edit Mouse |

Nipped-B-like protein (NIPBL), also known as SCC2 or delangin, is a protein that in humans is encoded by the NIPBL gene. NIPBL is required for the association of cohesin with DNA and is the major subunit of the cohesin loading complex. Heterozygous mutations in NIPBL account for an estimated 60% of case of Cornelia de Lange Syndrome.

== Structure and interactions ==
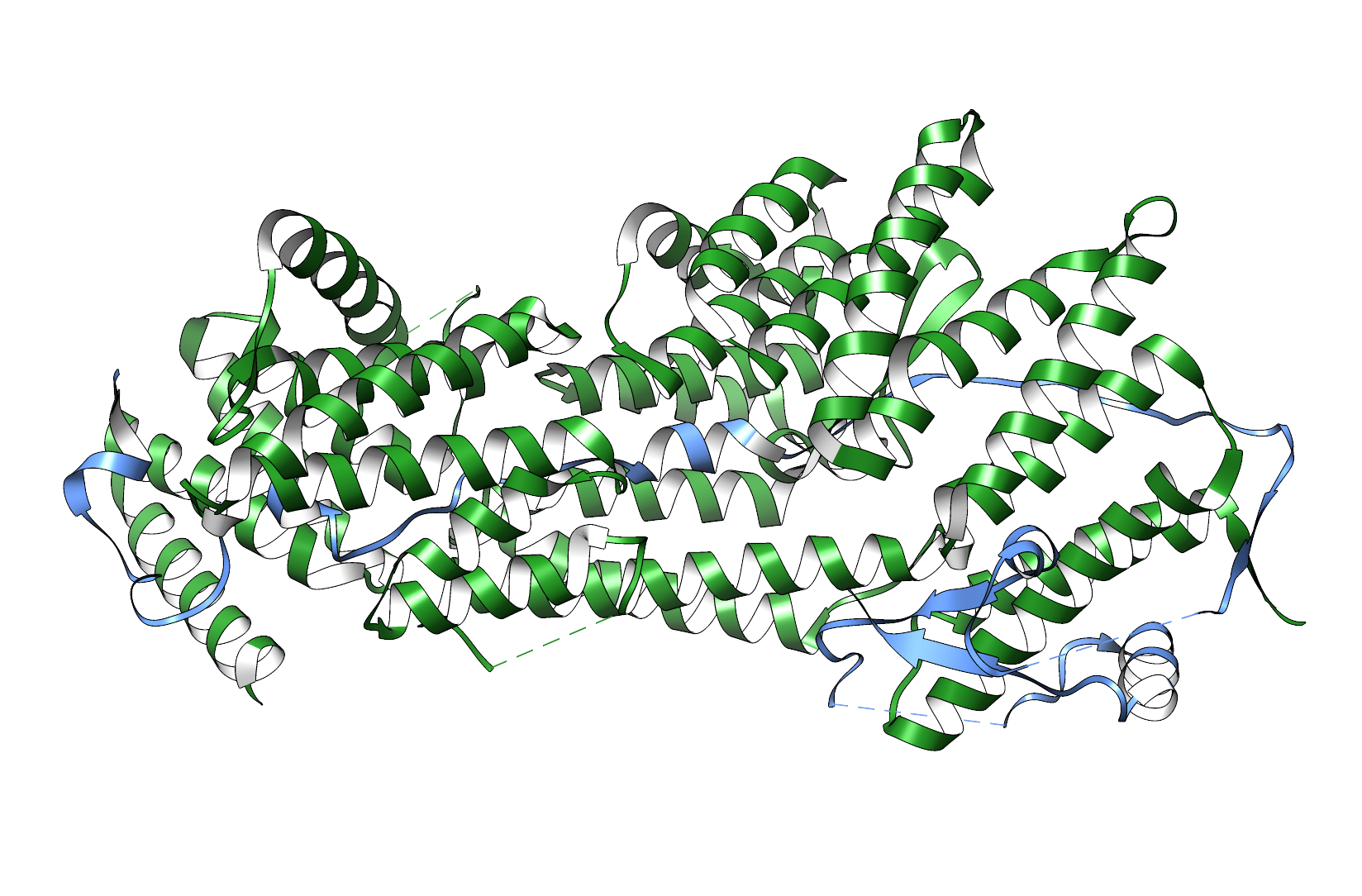
Structure of SCC4 (green) in complex with SCC2 N-terminal domain (blue) from budding yeast (Hinshaw et al., 2015)

NIPBL is a large hook-shaped protein containing HEAT repeats. NIPBL forms a complex with MAU2 (Scc4 in budding yeast) known as the cohesin loading complex. As this name suggests NIPBL and MAU2 are required for the initial association of cohesin with DNA.

Cohesin is thought to mediate enhancer-promoter interactions and generate Topologically associating domains (TADs). As well as mediating cohesion and regulating DNA architecture the cohesin complex is required for DNA repair by homologous recombination. Given that NIPBL is required for cohesin's association with DNA it is thought that NIPBL is also required for all of these processes. Consistently, inactivation of Nipbl results in the loss topologically associating domains and cohesion.

NIPBL binds dynamically to chromatin principally through an association with cohesin. NIPBL's movement within chromatin is consistent with a mechanism involving hopping between chromosomal cohesin rings. A cohesin-independent function in the regulation of gene expression has also been demonstrated for NIPBL.

== Clinical significance ==
Mutations in this gene result in Cornelia de Lange syndrome (CdLS), a disorder characterized by dysmorphic facial features, growth delay, limb reduction defects, and intellectual disability. As these mutations are usually heterozygous, CdLS is caused by a reduction in the abundance of Nipbl, not a complete loss. Experiments on cells from patients and mice indicate that the reduction is by less than half. It is not known why a reduction in Nipbl expression results in CdLS.
