= STAG2 =

Protein-coding gene in humans

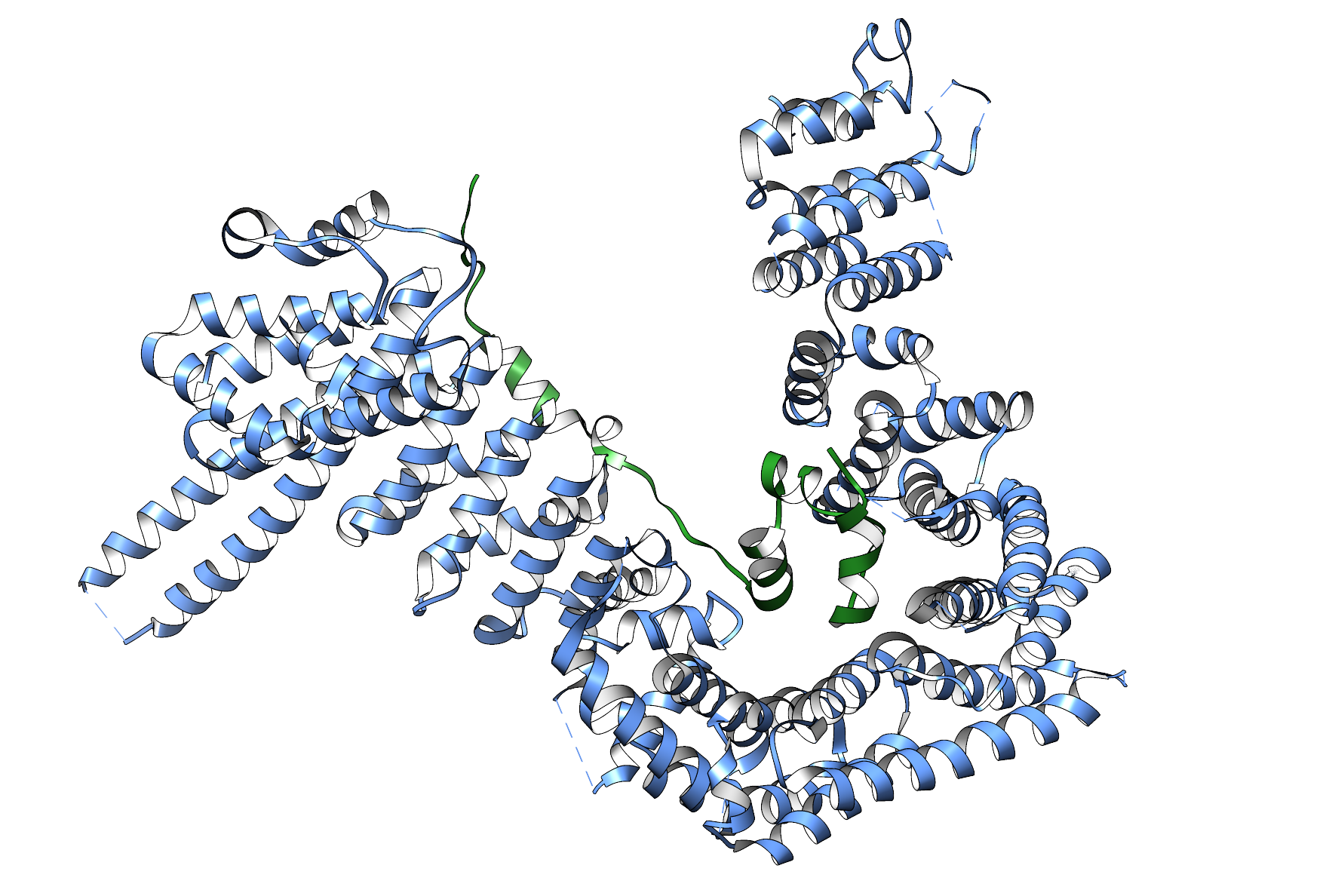

Identifiers
- Aliases: STAG2, SA-2, SA2, SCC3B, bA517O1.1, stromal antigen 2, NEDXCF, MKMS, HPE13
- External IDs: OMIM: 300826; MGI: 1098583; GeneCards: STAG2
Available structures
PDB	Ortholog search: PDBe RCSB
PDB	List of PDB id codes 4PJU, 4PJW, 4PK7

Gene location (Human)
Chr.	X chromosome (human)
Band	Xq25	Start	123,960,212 bp
Band	Xq25	End	124,422,664 bp

Gene location (Mouse)
Chr.	X chromosome (mouse)
Band	X|X A4	Start	41,238,194 bp
Band	X|X A4	End	41,366,062 bp
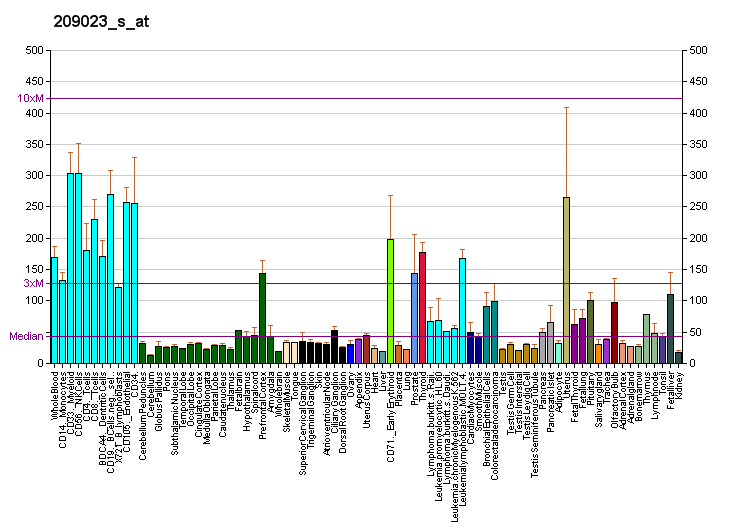

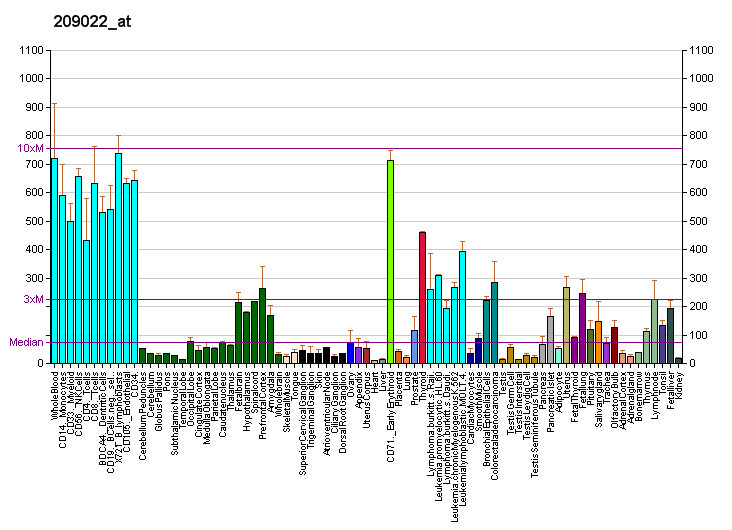

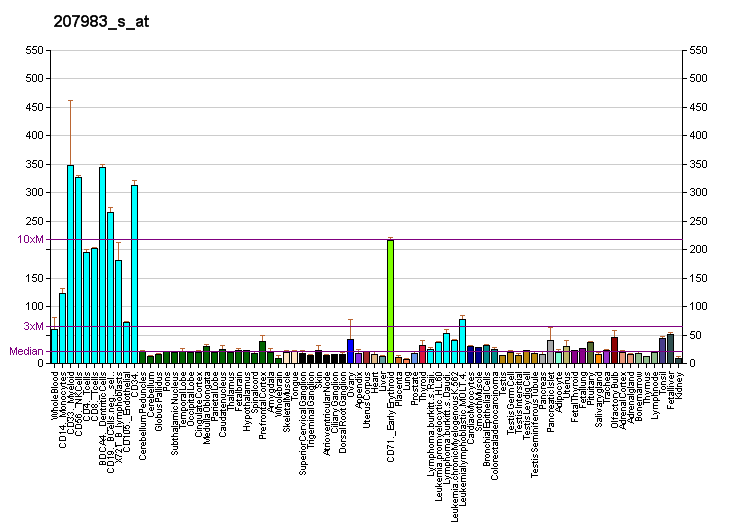
RNA expression pattern
Bgee	Human / Mouse (ortholog); Top expressed in: mucosa of paranasal sinus; Achilles tendon; sural nerve; Epithelium of choroid plexus; trabecular bone; lower lobe of lung; lactiferous duct; epithelium of colon; cartilage tissue; ventricular zone / Top expressed in: vestibular membrane of cochlear duct; left lung lobe; parotid gland; atrioventricular valve; carotid body; medial ganglionic eminence; lacrimal gland; hair follicle; Epithelium of choroid plexus; vestibular sensory epithelium; More reference expression data
BioGPS	More reference expression data
Gene ontology
Molecular function	protein binding; chromatin binding
Cellular component	cytosol; membrane; chromosome; nucleoplasm; chromatin; chromosome, centromeric region; nucleus; cohesin complex; nuclear matrix; mitotic spindle pole
Biological process	chromosome segregation; cell division; negative regulation of DNA endoreduplication; meiosis; cell cycle; sister chromatid cohesion; regulation of mitotic spindle assembly
Sources:Amigo / QuickGO
Orthologs
Databases	NCBI: entry; OMA: entry
Species	Human	Mouse
Entrez	10735	20843
Ensembl	ENSG00000101972	ENSMUSG00000025862
UniProt	Q8N3U4	O35638
RefSeq (mRNA)	NM_001042749; NM_001042750; NM_001042751; NM_001282418; NM_006603 NM_001375375	NM_001077712; NM_001290713; NM_021465; NM_001358225
RefSeq (protein)	NP_001036214; NP_001036215; NP_001036216; NP_001269347; NP_006594 NP_001362304	NP_001071180; NP_001277642; NP_067440; NP_001345154
Location (UCSC)	Chr X: 123.96 – 124.42 Mb	Chr X: 41.24 – 41.37 Mb
PubMed search
- Wikidata
View/Edit Human	View/Edit Mouse

Cohesin subunit SA-2 (SA2) is a protein that in humans is encoded by the STAG2 gene. SA2 is a subunit of the Cohesin complex which mediates sister chromatid cohesion, homologous recombination and DNA looping. In somatic cells cohesin is formed of SMC3, SMC1, RAD21 and either SA1 or SA2 whereas in meiosis, cohesin is formed of SMC3, SMC1B, REC8 and SA3.

STAG2 is frequently mutated in a range of cancers and several other disorders.

== Function ==
SA2 is part of the cohesin complex, which is a structure that holds the sister chromatids together after DNA replication. STAG2 has been shown to interact with STAG1. Cohesion folds by DNA loop extrusion and this cohesion consists of SMC1, SMC3, RAD21, and either STAG1 or STAG2. SA2 interacts with a ring-like structure composed of SMC1A, SMC3, and RAD21, to form the core of the cohesin complex. The ring-like structure binds chromosomes together until degradation of the cohesin complex is finished during cell division. This allows for the replicated chromosomes to separate into two new cells. Another role of STAG2 is to encode the stromal antigen 2 protein, which is involved in chromatin organization, transcription, DNA repair and control of downstream gene expression.

== Structure ==
Of the cohesin complex, STAG2 is the subunit where the most variants have been reported in cancer. This is thought to be because this gene is located in the X chromosome, therefore only one mutation is needed to inactivate it. Xq25 duplication syndrome, is an X-linked neurodevelopmental disorder that results in delayed development and intellectual disability associated with abnormal behavior and dysmorphic facial features, and the whole STAG2 gene can develop STAG2 encephalopathy. This has all the symptoms of epilepsy with eyelid myoclonia and absences (EMA), and was formally named Jeavons syndrome (JS).

== Mutations ==
One result of mutations in STAG2 can result in one third of non-muscle-invasive bladder cancer to have complete loss of SA2 protein. The loss of this protein has been shown to indicate the prognosis of disease and survival. it has been shown there was a delay in maturation of oligodendrocytes and transcription of myelination-related genes was reduced. Cohesion is needed in proper gene expression in specific cells and an implication the myelination is affected in a negative way. Mutations of STAG2 occur frequently in many cancers, which indicates this protein has a role in cancer. Mutations of the STAG2 gene are frequently seen in multiple adult and pediatric cancers. STAG has been found to be the only gene of 12 that is mutated significantly in at least four types of cancers.
