= Sister chromatids =

Two identical copies of a chromosome joined at the centromere

The paternal (blue) chromosome and the maternal (pink) chromosome are homologous chromosomes. Following chromosomal DNA replication, the blue chromosome is composed of two identical sister chromatids and the pink chromosome is composed of two identical sister chromatids. In mitosis, the sister chromatids separate into the daughter cells, but are now referred to as chromosomes (rather than chromatids) much in the way that one child is not referred to as a single twin.

Schematic karyogram of a human, showing a diploid set of chromosomes as seen in the G_{0} and G_{1} phases of the cell cycle (before DNA synthesis), including the chromosome 3 pair to the left in blue box at top center. To the right in that box, it also shows the chromosome 3 pair after DNA synthesis but before cell division (including the G_{2} phase and metaphase), wherein each paired "chromosome arm" is a sister chromatid.

A sister chromatid refers to the identical copies (chromatids) formed by the DNA replication of a chromosome, with both copies joined together by a common centromere. In other words, a sister chromatid may also be said to be 'one-half' of the duplicated chromosome. A pair of sister chromatids is called a dyad. A full set of sister chromatids is created during the synthesis (S) phase of interphase, when all the chromosomes in a cell are replicated. The two sister chromatids are separated from each other into two different cells during mitosis or during the second division of meiosis.

Compare sister chromatids to homologous chromosomes, which are the two different copies of a chromosome that diploid organisms (like humans) inherit, one from each parent. Sister chromatids are by and large identical (since they carry the same alleles, also called variants or versions, of genes) because they derive from one original chromosome. An exception is towards the end of meiosis, after crossing over has occurred, because sections of each sister chromatid may have been exchanged with corresponding sections of the homologous chromatids with which they are paired during meiosis. Homologous chromosomes might or might not be the same as each other because they derive from different parents.

There is evidence that, in some species, sister chromatids are the preferred template for DNA repair. Sister chromatid cohesion is essential for the correct distribution of genetic information between daughter cells and the repair of damaged chromosomes. Defects in this process may lead to aneuploidy and cancer, especially when checkpoints fail to detect DNA damage or when incorrectly attached mitotic spindles do not function properly.

== Mitosis ==
Condensation and resolution of human sister chromatids in early mitosis

Mitotic recombination is primarily a result of DNA repair processes responding to spontaneous or induced damages. Homologous recombinational repair during mitosis is largely limited to interaction between nearby sister chromatids that are present in a cell subsequent to DNA replication but prior to cell division. Due to the special nearby relationship they share, sister chromatids are not only preferred over distant homologous chromatids as substrates for recominational repair, but have the capacity to repair more DNA damage than do homologs.

== Meiosis ==
Studies with the budding yeast Saccharomyces cerevisiae indicate that inter-sister recombination occurs frequently during meiosis, and up to one-third of all recombination events occur between sister chromatids.

== See also ==
- Biorientation
- Sister chromatid exchange
