= Homologous somatic pairing =

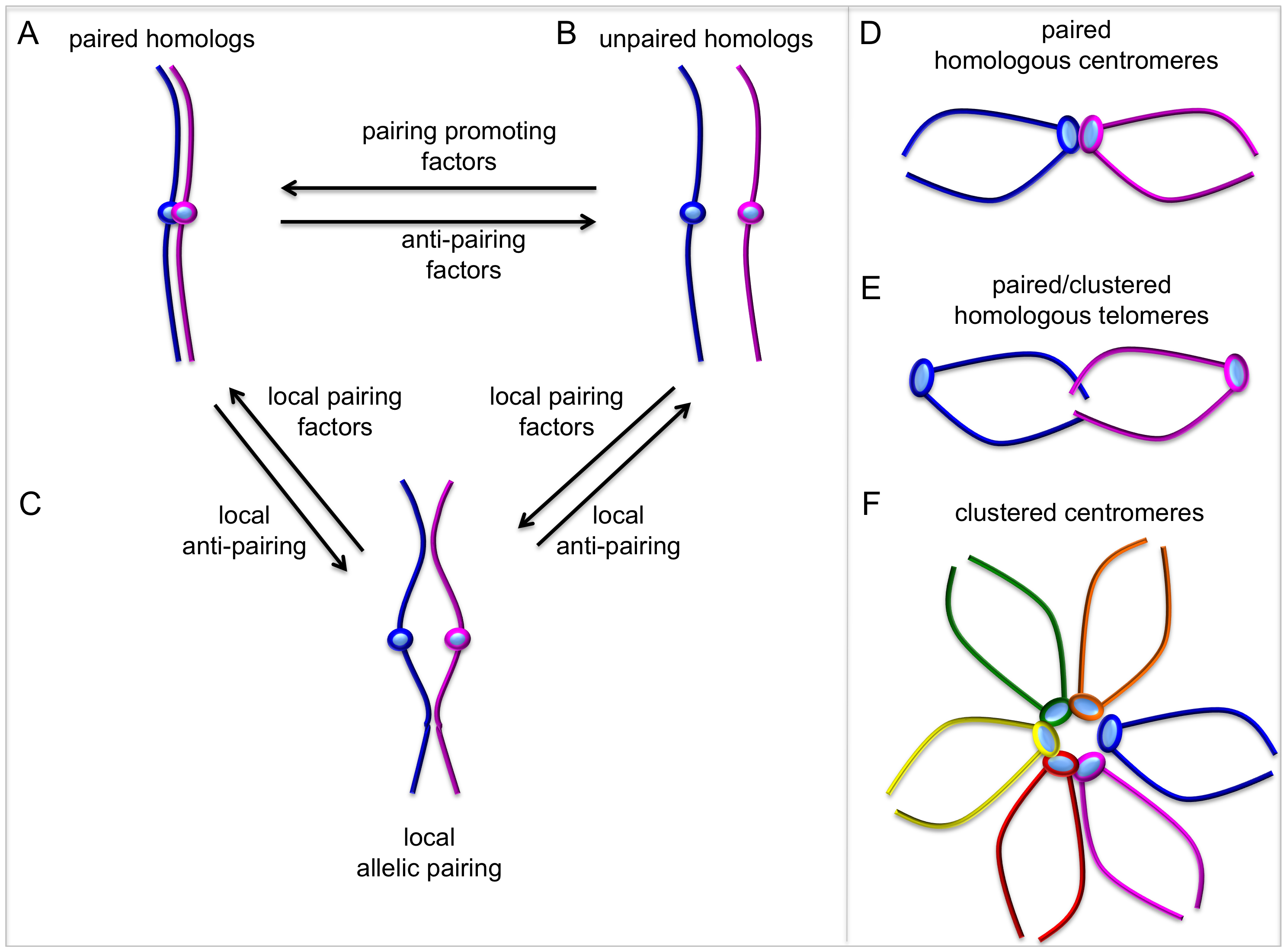
Dynamic chromosome pairing. The term "pairing" describes the spatial juxtaposition of entire homologous chromosomes, allelic sequences, and/or homologous sequences at non-allelic locations. (A, B) Homologous chromosomes can exist as paired throughout their entire length and the relative activities of pairing and anti-pairing factors determine the degree of global chromosome pairing. (C) Local pairing and anti-pairing factors can affect pairing status of specific genes or chromosomal regions. Local "pairing centers" can nucleate global pairing, but it is unclear whether factors regulating local pairing are different from global pairing factors. (D–F) In some cases, centromeres or telomeres from homologs can pair or cluster with non-homologous chromosomes, while there is no pairing along chromosome arms

Somatic pairing of homologous chromosomes is similar to pre- and early meiotic pairing (see article: Homologous chromosome#In meiosis), and has been observed in Diptera (Drosophila), and budding yeast, for example (whether it evolved multiple times in metazoans is unclear). Mammals show little pairing apart from in germline cells, taking place at specific loci, and under the control of developmental signalling (understood as a subset of other long-range interchromosomal interactions such as looping, and organisation into chromosomal territories).

While meiotic pairing has been extensively studied, the role of somatic pairing has remained less well understood, and even whether it is mechanistically related to meiotic pairing is unknown.

Somatic homolog pairing is required for the process of transvection to occur, by which an allele on one chromosome is able to influence the expression of a homologue on a different chromosome. High-resolution contact maps (Hi-C) in Drosophila have indicated that homolog pairing occurs genome-wide, with more closely associated alleles being correlated to active gene expression.

== Early work ==
The first review of somatic pairing was made by Charles W. Metz in 1916, citing the first descriptions of pairing made in 1907 and 1908 by N. M. Stevens in germline cells, who noted:

"it may therefore be true that pairing of homologous chromosomes occurs in connection with each mitosis throughout the life history of these insects" (p.215)

Stevens noted the potential for communication and a role in heredity.

While meiotic homologous pairing subsequently became well studied, somatic pairing remained neglected due to what has been described as "limitations in cytological tools for measuring pairing and genetic tools for perturbing pairing dynamics".

== Recent findings from high-throughput screening ==
In 1998 it was determined that homologous pairing in Drosophila occurs through independent initiations (as opposed to a directed, 'processive zippering' motion).

The first RNAi screen (based on DNA FISH) was carried out to identify genes regulating D. melanogaster somatic pairing in 2012, described at the time as providing "an extensive "parts list" of mostly novel factors". These comprised 40 pairing promoting genes and 65 'anti-pairing' genes (of which 2 and 1 were already known, respectively), many of which have human orthologs.

An earlier RNAi screen in 2007 showed the disruption of Topoisomerase II activity impairs somatic pairing within Drosophila tissue culture, indicating a role for topoisomerase-mediated organisation (or the direct interactions of topoisomerase enzymes) in pairing. Condensin (despite dependent interactions with Topoisomerase II) is antagonistic to Drosophila homologous pairing.
