= Lamina associated domains =

Lamina-associated domains (LADs) are large associations of chromatin that are found within the nuclear lamina. Making up approximately 40% of the genome, LADs consist mostly of gene poor regions and span between 40kb to 30Mb in size. There are two known types of LADs: constitutive LADs (cLADs) and facultative LADs (fLADs).

cLADs are A-T rich heterochromatin regions that remain on lamina and are seen across many types of cells and species. There is evidence that these regions are important to the structural formation of interphase chromosomes. On the other hand, fLADs have varying lamina interactions and contain genes that are either activated or repressed between individual cells indicating cell-type specificity. The boundaries of LADs, like self-interacting domains, are enriched in transcriptional elements and architectural protein binding sites.

LADs consist mostly of transcriptionally silent chromatin, being enriched with trimethylated Lys27 on histone H3, (i.e. H3K27me3); which is a common posttranslational histonemodification of heterochromatin. LADs are also known to have CTCF-binding sites at their periphery.

== See also ==
- Topologically associating domain
- Nuclear organization
- Chromosome territories
