= Job Dekker =

Dutch biochemist

Job Dekker is a Dutch biologist. Dekker is a professor in the Department of Systems Biology, and the Department of Biochemistry and Molecular Biotechnology at the University of Massachusetts Chan Medical School and an Investigator at the Howard Hughes Medical Institute.

Dekker studied molecular genetics and biochemistry as an undergraduate at Utrecht University, where he also obtained a Ph.D. in Physiological Chemistry in 1997. During his postdoctoral studies in Nancy Kleckner’s lab at Harvard University, Dekker developed a method, called chromosome conformation capture, for identifying a matrix of the pair-wise interactions between different sites of chromatin and inferring the spatial folding of chromosomes from this information. Dekker's work has led to insights into how genomes are folded in three dimensions, the mechanisms that cells employ to fold chromosomes, and how chromosome folding contributes to gene regulation and chromosome segregation.

Awarded the Edward Novitski Prize in 2018, and the Biochemical Society International Award in 2018. Dekker is a member of the National Academy of Sciences (2022), and the National Academy of Medicine (2021).
