= Transcription factory =

Sites in the cell nucleus where DNA transcription occurs

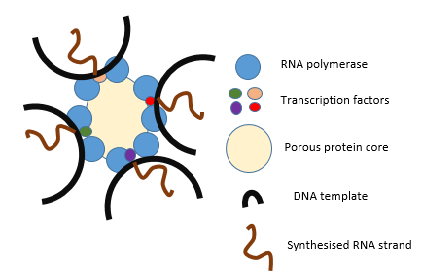
A generic transcription factory during transcription, highlighting the possibility of transcribing more than one gene at a time. The diagram includes 8 RNA polymerases however the number can vary depending on cell type. The image also includes transcription factors and a porous, protein core.

Transcription factories, in genetics describe the discrete sites where transcription occurs in the cell nucleus, and are an example of a biomolecular condensate. They were first discovered in 1993 and have been found to have structures analogous to replication factories, sites where replication also occurs in discrete sites. The factories contain an RNA polymerase (active or inactive) and the necessary transcription factors (activators and repressors) for transcription. Transcription factories containing RNA polymerase II are the most studied but factories can exist for RNA polymerase I and III; the nucleolus being seen as the prototype for transcription factories. It is possible to view them under both light and electron microscopy. The discovery of transcription factories has challenged the original view of how RNA polymerase interacts with the DNA polymer and it is thought that the presence of factories has important effects on gene regulation and nuclear structure.

== Discovery ==
The first use of the term ‘transcription factory’ was used in 1993 by Jackson and his colleagues who noticed that transcription occurred at discrete sites in the nucleus. This contradicted the original view that transcription occurred at an even distribution throughout the nucleus.

== Structure ==
The structure of a transcription factory appears to be determined by cell type, transcriptional activity of the cell and also the method of technique used to visualise the structure. The generalised view of a transcription factory would feature between 4 – 30 RNA polymerase molecules and it is thought that the more transcriptionally active a cell is, the more polymerases that will be present in a factory in order to meet the demands of transcription. The core of the factory is porous and protein rich, with the hyperphosphorylated, elongating form polymerases on the perimeter. The type of proteins present include: ribonucleoproteins, co-activators, transcription factors, RNA helicase and splicing and processing enzymes. A factory only contains one type of RNA polymerase and the diameter of the factory varies depending on the RNA polymerase featured; RNA polymerase I factories are roughly 500 nm in width whereas RNA polymerase II and III factories a magnitude smaller at 50 nm. It has been experimentally shown that the transcription factory is immobilised to a structure and it is postulated that this immobilisation is because of a tethering to the nuclear matrix; this is because it has been shown it is tied to a structure that is unaffected by restriction enzymes. Proteins that have been thought to be involved in the tethering includes spectrin, actin and lamins.

== Function ==
The structure of a transcriptional factory directly relates to its function. Transcription is made more efficient because of the clustered nature of the transcription factory. All the necessary proteins: RNA polymerase, transcription factors and other co-regulators are present in the transcription factory that allows for faster RNA polymerisation when the DNA template reaches the factory, it also allows for a number of genes to be transcribed at the same time.

== Genomic location ==
The amount of transcription factories found per nucleus appears to be determined by cell type, species and the type of measurement. Cultured mouse embryonic fibroblasts have been found to have roughly 1500 factories through immunofluorescence detection of RNAP II however cells taken from different tissues of the same mouse group had between 100 and 300 factories. Measurements of the number of transcription factories in HeLa cells give a varied result. For example, using the traditional fluorescence microscopy approach 300 – 500 factories were found but using both confocal and electron microscopy roughly 2100 were detected.

The number of transcription factories in a nucleus appears to depend on the cell type and species, and also in part on the measurement procedure; most data would suggest that factory numbers range from a few hundred to a thousand per nucleus, with perhaps some exceptional cases in which factory numbers may be much larger. The number of factories per nucleus varies from 100 – 8000 depending on the cell type, differentiation state, and the detection method used.

== Factory specialisation ==
In addition to the specialisation factories have for the type of RNA polymerase they contain, there is a further level of specialisation present. There are some factories that only transcribe a certain set of related genes, this further strengthens the concept that the main function of a transcription factory is for transcriptional efficiency.

== Assembly and maintenance ==
There is much debate to whether transcription factories assemble because of the transcriptional demands of the genome or if they are stable structures that are conserved over time. Experimentally, it appears that they remain fixed over a short period of time; newly made mRNA were pulse labelled over 15 minutes and it showed no new transcription factories appearing. This is also supported by inhibition experiments. In these studies heat shock was used to turn off transcription which resulted in no change in the number of polymerases detected. Upon further analysis of western blot data it was suggested that there was in fact a slight decrease over time of transcription factories. Therefore, it could be claimed that polymerase molecules are released gently over time from the factory when there is a lack of transcription which would eventually lead to the complete loss of the transcription factory.

There is also several pieces of evidence that promotes the idea of transcription factories assembling de novo due to transcriptional demands. GFP polymerase fluorescence experiments have shown that the inducement of transcription in Drosophila polytene nuclei leads to the formation of a factory which contradicts the notion of a stable and secure structure.

== Mechanism ==
The hypothesis that it is the transcription factory that remains immobilised during transcription as opposed to the DNA template. It shows how a section of the gene being transcribed (brown) gets pulled and shuttled through the RNA polymerase during the process.

It was previously thought that it was the relatively small RNA polymerase that moves along the comparatively larger DNA template during transcription. However, increasing evidence supports the notion that due to the tethering of a transcription factory to the nuclear matrix, it is in fact the large DNA template that is moved to accommodate RNA polymerisation. In vitro studies for example have shown that RNA polymerases attached to a surface are capable of both rotating the DNA template and threading it through the polymerase to start transcription; which indicates the capabilities of RNA polymerase to be a molecular motor. Chromosome Conformation Capture (3C) also supports the idea of the DNA template diffusing towards a stationary RNA polymerase.

There remains a doubt to this mechanism of transcription. Firstly, it is unknown how a stationary polymerase is capable of transcribing genes on the (+)-strand and (-)-strand at the same genomic locus at the same time. This is in addition to a lack of conclusive evidence on how the polymerase remains immobilised (how it is tethered) and what structure it is tethered to.

== Effect on genomic and nuclear structure ==
The attraction of related genes to RNAP and the required transcription factors causes the formation of a chromatin loop, thereby affecting the genome structure

There are several consequences the formation of a transcription factory has on nuclear and genomic structures. It has been proposed that the factories are responsible for nuclear organisation; they have been suggested to promote chromatin loop formation by two potential mechanisms:

The first mechanism suggests that loops form because 2 genes on the same chromosome require the same transcription machinery that would be found in a specific transcription factory. This requirement will attract the gene loci to the factory thus creating a loop.

Transcription factories are also suggested to be responsible for gene clustering, this is because related genes would require the same transcriptional machinery and if a factory satisfies these needs the genes would be attracted to the factory. While the clustering of genes can be beneficial for transcriptional efficiency, there could be negative consequences to this. Gene translocation events occur when genes are in close proximity to one another; which will occur more often when a transcriptional factory is present. Gene translocation events, like point mutations, generally are detrimental to the organism and so therefore could lead to the possibility of disease. However, on the other hand recent research has suggested that there is no correlation between inter-gene interactions and translocation frequencies.

== See also ==
- Chromosome territories – Regions of the nucleus
- Nuclear bodies – Structures found in the cell nuclei
- Epigenetics – Study of DNA modifications that do not change its sequence
