= Insulator (genetics) =

Genetic boundary element that blocks the interaction between enhancers and promoters

An insulator is a type of cis-regulatory element known as a long-range regulatory element. Found in multicellular eukaryotes and working over distances from the promoter element of the target gene, an insulator is typically 300 bp to 2000 bp in length. Insulators contain clustered binding sites for sequence specific DNA-binding proteins and mediate intra- and inter-chromosomal interactions.

Insulators function either as an enhancer-blocker or a barrier, or both. The mechanisms by which an insulator performs these two functions include loop formation and nucleosome modifications. There are many examples of insulators, including the CTCF insulator, the gypsy insulator, and the β-globin locus. The CTCF insulator is especially important in vertebrates, while the gypsy insulator is implicated in Drosophila. The β-globin locus was first studied in chicken and then in humans for its insulator activity, both of which utilize CTCF.

The genetic implications of insulators lie in their involvement in a mechanism of imprinting and their ability to regulate transcription. Mutations to insulators are linked to cancer as a result of cell cycle disregulation, tumourigenesis, and silencing of growth suppressors.

== Function ==
Insulators have two main functions:

1. Enhancer-blocking insulators prevent distal enhancers from acting on the promoter of neighbouring genes
2. Barrier insulators prevent silencing of euchromatin by inhibiting the spread of neighbouring heterochromatin

While enhancer-blocking is classified as an inter-chromosomal interaction, acting as a barrier is classified as an intra-chromosomal interaction. The need for insulators arises where two adjacent genes on a chromosome have very different transcription patterns; it is critical that the inducing or repressing mechanisms of one do not interfere with the neighbouring gene. Insulators have also been found to cluster at the boundaries of topologically associating domains (TADs) and may have a role in partitioning the genome into "chromosome neighborhoods" - genomic regions within which regulation occurs.

Some insulators can act as both enhancer blocker and barriers, and some just have one of the two functions. Some examples of different insulators are:

- Drosophila melanogaster insulators gypsy and scs scs are both enhancer-blocking insulators
- Gallus gallus have insulators, Lys 5' A that have both enhancer-blocking and barrier activity, as well as HS4 that have only enhancer-blocking activity
- Saccharomyces cerevisiae insulators STAR and UAS_{rpg} are both barrier insulators
- Homo sapiens HS5 insulator acts as an enhancer-blocker

== Mechanism of action ==
=== Enhancer-blocking insulators ===

Similar mechanism of action for enhancer-blocking insulators; chromatin loop domains are formed in the nucleus that separates the enhancer and the promoter of a target gene. Loop domains are formed through the interaction between enhancer-blocking elements interacting with each other or securing chromatin fibre to structural elements within the nucleus. The action of these insulators is dependent on being positioned between the promoter of the target gene and the upstream or down stream enhancer. The specific way in which insulators block enhancers is dependent on the enhancers mode of action. Enhancers can directly interact with their target promoters through looping (direct-contact model), in which case an insulator prevents this interaction through the formation of a loop domain that separates the enhancer and promoter sites and prevents the promoter-enhancer loop from forming. An enhancer can also act on a promoter through a signal (tracking model of enhancer action). This signal may be blocked by an insulator through the targeting of a nucleoprotein complex at the base of the loop formation.

=== Barrier insulators ===
Barrier activity has been linked to the disruption of specific processes in the heterochromatin formation pathway. These types of insulators modify the nucleosomal substrate in the reaction cycle that is central to heterochromatin formation. Modifications are achieved through various mechanisms including nucleosome removal, in which nucleosome-excluding elements disrupt heterochromatin from spreading and silencing (chromatin-mediated silencing). Modification can also be done through recruitment of histone acetyltransferase(s) and ATP-dependent nucleosome remodelling complexes.

== CTCF insulator ==
The CTCF insulator appears to have enhancer blocking activity via its 3D structure and have no direct connection with barrier activity. Vertebrates in particular appear to rely heavily on the CTCF insulator, however there are many different insulator sequences identified. Insulated neighborhoods formed by physical interaction between two CTCF-bound DNA loci contain the interactions between enhancers and their target genes.

=== Regulation ===
One mechanism of regulating CTCF is via methylation of its DNA sequence. CTCF protein is known to favourably bind to unmethylated sites, so it follows that methylation of CpG islands is a point of epigenetic regulation. An example of this is seen in the Igf2-H19 imprinted locus where methylation of the paternal imprinted control region (ICR) prevents CTCF from binding. A second mechanism of regulation is through regulating proteins that are required for fully functioning CTCF insulators. These proteins include, but are not limited to cohesin, RNA polymerase, and CP190.

== gypsy insulator ==
The insulator element that is found in the gypsy retrotransposon of Drosophila is one of several sequences that have been studied in detail. The gypsy insulator can be found in the 5' untranslated region (UTR) of the retrotransposon element. Gypsy affects the expression of adjacent genes pending insertion into a new genomic location, causing mutant phenotypes that are both tissue specific and present at certain developmental stages. The insulator likely has an inhibitory effect on enhancers that control the spatial and temporal expression of the affected gene.

== β-globin locus ==
The first examples of insulators in vertebrates was seen in the chicken β-globin locus, cHS4. cHS4 marks the border between the active euchromatin in the β-globin locus and the upstream heterochromatin region that is highly condensed and inactive. The cHS4 insulator acts as both a barrier to chromatin-mediated silencing via heterochromatin spreading, and blocks interactions between enhancers and promoters. A distinguishing characteristic of cHS4 is that it has a repetitive heterochromatic region on its 5' end.

The human β-globin locus homologue of cHS4 is HS5. Different from the chicken β-globin locus, the human β-globin locus has an open chromatin structure and is not flanked by a 5' heterochromatic region. HS5 is thought to be a genetic insulator in vivo as it has both enhancer-blocking activity and transgene barrier activities.

CTCF was first characterized for its role in regulating β-globin gene expression. At this locus, CTCF functions as an insulator-binding protein forming a chromosomal boundary. CTCF is present in both the chicken β-globin locus and human β-globin locus. Within cHS4 of the chicken β-globin locus, CTCF binds to a region (FII) that is responsible for enhancer blocking activity.

== Genetic implications ==
=== Imprinting ===
The ability of enhancers to activate imprinted genes is dependent on the presence of an insulator on the unmethylated allele between the two genes. An example of this is the Igf2-H19 imprinted locus. In this locus the CTCF protein regulates imprinted expression by binding to the unmethylated maternal imprinted control region (ICR) but not on the paternal ICR. When bound to the unmethylated maternal sequence, CTCF effectively blocks downstream enhancer elements from interacting with the Igf2 gene promoter, leaving only the H19 gene to be expressed.

=== Transcription ===
When insulator sequences are located in close proximity to the promoter of a gene, it has been suggested that they might serve to stabilize enhancer-promoter interactions. When they are located farther away from the promoter, insulator elements would compete with the enhancer and interfere with activation of transcription. Loop formation is common in eukaryotes to bring distal elements (enhancers, promoters, locus control regions) into closer proximity for interaction during transcription. The mechanism of enhancer-blocking insulators then, if in the correct position, could play a role in regulating transcription activation.

== Mutations and cancer ==
CTCF insulators affect the expression of genes implicated in cell cycle regulation processes that are important for cell growth, cell differentiation, and programmed cell death (apoptosis). Two of these cell cycle regulation genes that are known to interact with CTCF are hTERT and C-MYC. In these cases, a loss of function mutation to the CTCF insulator gene changes the expression patterns and may affect the interplay between cell growth, differentiation and apoptosis and lead to tumourigenesis or other problems.

CTCF is also required for the expression of tumour repressor retinoblastoma (Rb) gene and mutations and deletions of this gene are associated with inherited malignancies. When the CTCF binding site is removed expression of Rb is decreased and tumours are able to thrive.

Other genes that encode cell cycle regulators include BRCA1, and p53, which are growth suppressors that are silenced in many cancer types, and whose expression is controlled by CTCF. Loss of function of CTCF in these genes leads to the silencing of the growth suppressor and contributes to the formation of cancer.

The aberrant activation of insulators can modulate the expression of cancer-related genes, including matrix metalloproteinases involved in cancer cell invasion.
