= RTL3 =

Protein-coding gene in the species Homo sapiens

Identifiers
- Aliases: RTL3, Mar3, Mart3, ZHC5, ZCCHC5, zinc finger CCHC-type containing 5, SIRH9, retrotransposon Gag like 3
- External IDs: MGI: 2685221; GeneCards: RTL3

Gene location (Human)
Chr.	X chromosome (human)
Band	Xq21.1	Start	78,656,068 bp
Band	Xq21.1	End	78,659,328 bp

Gene location (Mouse)
Chr.	X chromosome (mouse)
Band	X|X D	Start	105,880,688 bp
Band	X|X D	End	105,884,250 bp
RNA expression pattern
Bgee	Human / Mouse (ortholog); Top expressed in: gastric mucosa; right coronary artery; ascending aorta; tibia; Achilles tendon; apex of heart; smooth muscle tissue; popliteal artery; tibial arteries; left coronary artery / Top expressed in: efferent ductule; tongue muscle; dermis; human fetus; condyle; internal carotid artery; intrinsic muscle of tongue; external carotid artery; extrinsic muscle of tongue; atrioventricular valve; More reference expression data
BioGPS	n/a
Orthologs
Databases	NCBI: entry; OMA: entry
Species	Human	Mouse
Entrez	203430	213436
Ensembl	ENSG00000179300	ENSMUSG00000047686
UniProt	Q8N8U3	Q6P1Y1
RefSeq (mRNA)	NM_152694	NM_199468
RefSeq (protein)	NP_689907	NP_955762
Location (UCSC)	Chr X: 78.66 – 78.66 Mb	Chr X: 105.88 – 105.88 Mb
PubMed search
- Wikidata
View/Edit Human	View/Edit Mouse

Retrotransposon Gag like 3 is a protein that in humans is encoded by the RTL3 gene.

== Function ==
This gene is a member of a family of gag-related retrotransposon genes. These genes appear to have lost the ability to retrotranspose; however, their open reading frames have remained intact, which may indicate that these genes have acquired new functions in the cell. Retrotransposon gag-like-3 (RTL3/ZCCHC5/MART3) is one of eleven Sushi-like neogenes identified in the human genome7 RTL3 encodes a 53 kDa protein with a nucleic acid-binding domain (CX2CX4HX4C), gag-like region within the open reading frame and an ssDNA/RNA-binding homeobox-associated leucine zipper motif. It has been reported that RTL3 and SOX-9 co-regulate the expression of COL2A1 in chondrocytes.
