= SMARCA1 =

Protein-coding gene in humans

Identifiers
- Aliases: SMARCA1, ISWI, NURF140, SNF2L, SNF2L1, SNF2LB, SNF2LT, SWI, SWI2, hSNF2L, SWI/SNF related, matrix associated, actin dependent regulator of chromatin, subfamily a, member 1
- External IDs: OMIM: 300012; MGI: 1935127; GeneCards: SMARCA1

Gene location (Human)
Chr.	X chromosome (human)
Band	Xq25-q26.1	Start	129,446,501 bp
Band	Xq25-q26.1	End	129,523,500 bp

Gene location (Mouse)
Chr.	X chromosome (mouse)
Band	X|X A4	Start	46,898,245 bp
Band	X|X A4	End	46,981,851 bp
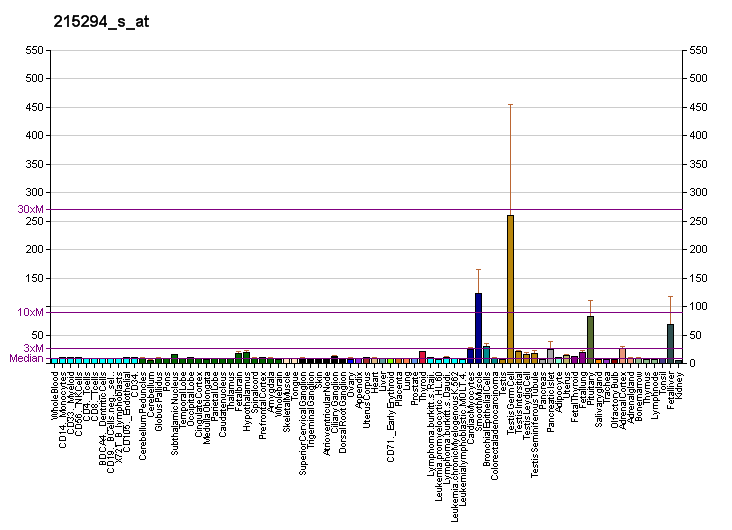

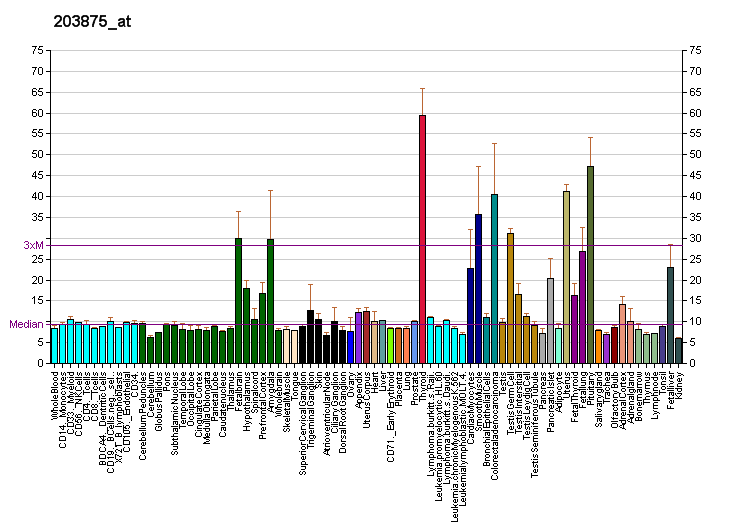

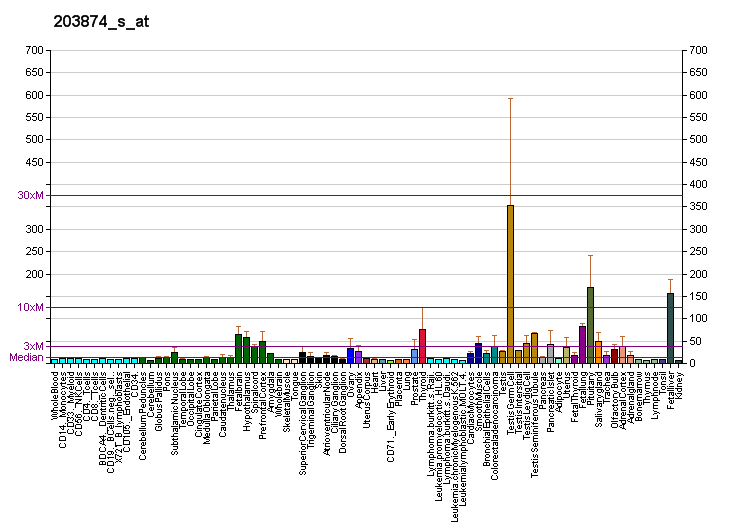
RNA expression pattern
Bgee	Human / Mouse (ortholog); Top expressed in: Epithelium of choroid plexus; tibia; endothelial cell; ventricular zone; right adrenal cortex; left adrenal cortex; parietal pleura; seminal vesicula; stromal cell of endometrium; cartilage tissue / Top expressed in: Gonadal ridge; vas deferens; fossa; efferent ductule; internal carotid artery; atrium; trigeminal ganglion; ureter; external carotid artery; ovary; More reference expression data
BioGPS	More reference expression data
Gene ontology
Molecular function	ATP-dependent DNA/DNA annealing activity; DNA binding; nucleotide binding; ATP-dependent activity, acting on DNA; helicase activity; hydrolase activity, acting on acid anhydrides, in phosphorus-containing anhydrides; protein binding; nucleic acid binding; nucleosome binding; hydrolase activity; ATP binding; transcription factor binding; ATPase activity; DNA-binding transcription factor activity, RNA polymerase II-specific
Cellular component	CERF complex; nucleus; nucleoplasm; intracellular membrane-bounded organelle; NURF complex
Biological process	chromatin remodeling; regulation of transcription, DNA-templated; transcription, DNA-templated; positive regulation of transcription, DNA-templated; brain development; neuron differentiation; chromatin organization; regulation of transcription by RNA polymerase II; positive regulation of transcription by RNA polymerase II
Sources:Amigo / QuickGO
Orthologs
Databases	NCBI: entry; OMA: entry
Species	Human	Mouse
Entrez	6594	93761
Ensembl	ENSG00000102038	ENSMUSG00000031099
UniProt	P28370	Q6PGB8
RefSeq (mRNA)	NM_001282874; NM_001282875; NM_003069; NM_139035; NM_001378261 NM_001378262; NM_001378263; NM_001378264	NM_001290708; NM_053123; NM_001358618; NM_001358619
RefSeq (protein)	NP_001269803; NP_001269804; NP_003060; NP_001365190; NP_001365191 NP_001365192; NP_001365193	NP_001277637; NP_444353; NP_001345547; NP_001345548
Location (UCSC)	Chr X: 129.45 – 129.52 Mb	Chr X: 46.9 – 46.98 Mb
PubMed search
- Wikidata
View/Edit Human	View/Edit Mouse

Probable global transcription activator SNF2L1 is a protein that in humans is encoded by the SMARCA1 gene.

The protein encoded by this gene is a member of the SWI/SNF family of proteins. Members of this family have helicase and ATPase activities and are thought to regulate transcription of certain genes by altering the chromatin structure around those genes. Two transcript variants encoding different isoforms have been found for this gene.
