= Carl Rabl =

Austrian anatomist

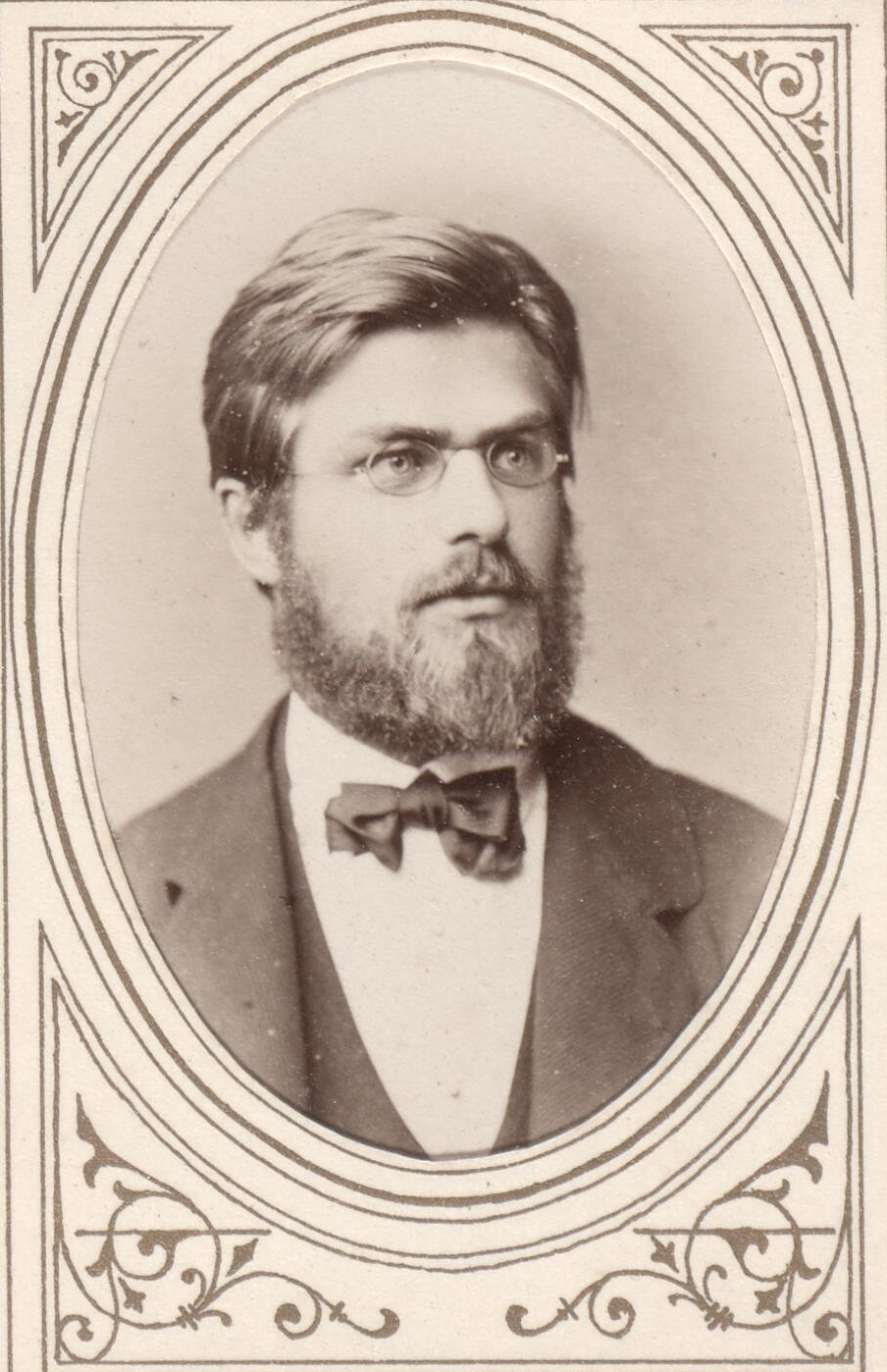
Carl Rabl, in 1876

Carl Rabl (2 May 1853 in Wels, Austria – 24 December 1917 in Leipzig, Germany) was an Austrian anatomist. His most notable achievement was on the structural consistency of chromosomes during the cell cycle. In 1885 he published that chromosomes do not lose their identity, even when they were not distinctly visible under the microscope.

== Life and work ==
Rabl was the son of a namesake physician. He studied at the Kremsmünster Gymnasium and became interested in natural history and was influenced by Ernst Haeckel’s Natürliche Schöpfungs-geschichte. He wanted to study under Ernst Haeckel at the University of Jena but went to study medicine in Vienna. In 1873 he transferred to the University of Leipzig and worked under Rudolf Leuckart on the development of gastropods. In 1874–75 he worked under Haeckel in Jena. He then worked in Vienna on histology under Ernst Wilhelm von Brücke. In 1882 he received his degree at Vienna and worked as an assistant to Karl Langer. In 1885 he went to teach at the German University in Prague (Charles University in Prague) and became an ordinary professor in 1886. In 1904 succeeded Wilhelm His as professor of anatomy at the University of Leipzig.

Rabl studied the formation of the germ layers in embryos. He stained chromosomes and studied the interphase arrangement. His studies on salamander embryos suggested that the chromosomes occupy distinct territories in the interphase nucleus.

In 1891 Rabl married Marie Virchow, the daughter of German pathologist Rudolf Virchow. In 1902 he was a nominee for the Nobel Prize for Physiology or Medicine — the prize was, however, awarded to Ronald Ross in 1902 for his work involving malaria.

== Other sources ==
1. Edmund B. Wilson. The Cell in Development and Inheritance. 1911. 2nd ed. London: Macmillan and Co. pg 294.
2. Carl Rabl: "Über Zelltheilung", Morphologisches Jahrbuch 10, 1885 (in German)
