= Chromosome territories =

Regions of the nucleus

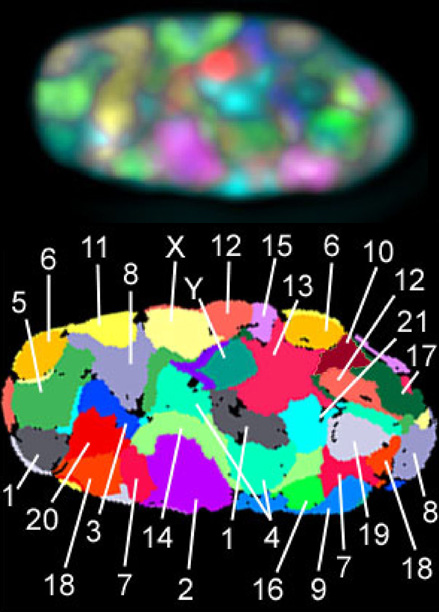
The 23 human chromosome territories during prometaphase in fibroblast cells

In cell biology, chromosome territories are regions of the nucleus preferentially occupied by particular chromosomes.

Interphase chromosomes are long DNA strands that are extensively folded, and are often described as appearing like a bowl of spaghetti. The chromosome territory concept holds that despite this apparent disorder, chromosomes largely occupy defined regions of the nucleus. Most eukaryotes are thought to have chromosome territories, although the budding yeast S. cerevisiae is an exception to this.

== Characteristics ==
Chromosome territories are spheroid with diameters on the order of one to few micrometers.

Nuclear compartments devoid of DNA called interchromatin compartments have been reported to tunnel into chromosome territories to facilitate molecular diffusion into the otherwise tightly packed chromosome-occupied regions.

== History and experimental support ==
The concept of chromosome territories was proposed by Carl Rabl in 1885 based on studies of Salamandra maculata.

Chromosome territories have gained recognition using fluorescence labeling techniques (fluorescence in situ hybridization).

Studies of genomic proximity using techniques like chromosome conformation capture have supported the chromosome territory concept by showing that DNA-DNA contacts predominantly happen within particular chromosomes.

== See also ==
- Transcription factories – Sites in the cell nucleus where DNA transcription occurs
- Nuclear bodies – Structures found in the cell nuclei
- Epigenetics – Study of DNA modifications that do not change its sequence
