= Methyltransferase like 4 =

Protein-coding gene in the species Homo sapiens

METTL4

Identifiers
- Aliases: METTL4, HsT661, methyltransferase like 4, methyltransferase 4, N6-adenosine
- External IDs: MGI: 1924031; GeneCards: METTL4
Enzyme activity
EC #	BRENDA	ExPASy	KEGG	MetaCyc
2.1.1.72	↗	↗	↗	↗

Gene location (Human)
Chr.	Chromosome 18 (human)
Band	18p11.32	Start	2,537,525 bp
Band	18p11.32	End	2,571,509 bp

Gene location (Mouse)
Chr.	Chromosome 17 (mouse)
Band	17|17 E5	Start	95,030,018 bp
Band	17|17 E5	End	95,057,447 bp
RNA expression pattern
Bgee	Human / Mouse (ortholog); Top expressed in: ventricular zone; secondary oocyte; gonad; Achilles tendon; ganglionic eminence; testicle; stromal cell of endometrium; granulocyte; spleen; islet of Langerhans / Top expressed in: superior cervical ganglion; secondary oocyte; zygote; spermatocyte; tail of embryo; primary oocyte; spermatid; lumbar spinal ganglion; hand; genital tubercle; More reference expression data
BioGPS	n/a
Gene ontology
Molecular function	methyltransferase activity; transferase activity; nucleic acid binding; site-specific DNA-methyltransferase (adenine-specific) activity
Cellular component	nucleus
Biological process	methylation; DNA methylation on adenine
Sources:Amigo / QuickGO
Orthologs
Databases	NCBI: entry; OMA: entry
Species	Human	Mouse
Entrez	64863	76781
Ensembl	ENSG00000101574	ENSMUSG00000055660
UniProt	Q8N3J2	Q3U034
RefSeq (mRNA)	NM_001308401; NM_022840	NM_176917; NM_001357135; NM_001357136; NM_001357137; NM_001357138
RefSeq (protein)	NP_001295330; NP_073751	NP_795891; NP_001344064; NP_001344065; NP_001344066; NP_001344067
Location (UCSC)	Chr 18: 2.54 – 2.57 Mb	Chr 17: 95.03 – 95.06 Mb
PubMed search
- Wikidata
View/Edit Human	View/Edit Mouse

Methyltransferase like 4 is a protein that in humans is encoded by the METTL4 gene.
