= Protein-disulfide reductase (glutathione) =

Class of enzymes

protein-disulfide reductase (glutathione)

Identifiers
- EC no.: 1.8.4.2
- CAS no.: 9082-53-5

Databases
- BRENDA: enzyme data
- ExPASy: NiceZyme view
- KEGG: enzyme entry
- MetaCyc: metabolic pathway
- Rhea: reactions
- PDB structures: RCSB PDB PDBe PDBsum
- Gene Ontology: AmiGO / QuickGO
Search
- PMC: articles
- PubMed: articles
- NCBI: proteins

In enzymology, a protein-disulfide reductase (glutathione) (EC 1.8.4.2) is an enzyme that catalyzes the chemical reaction

2 glutathione + protein-disulfide $\rightleftharpoons$ glutathione disulfide + protein-dithiol

Thus, the two substrates of this enzyme are glutathione and a disulfide-linked protein, whereas its two products are glutathione disulfide and protein dithiol.

In humans, at least one protein, TXNDC12, is thought to have enzyme activity of this type based on relatively recent data (2003).

Historically, the breaking of the disulfide bonds of insulin was thought to be catalyzed by an enzyme of this class, which researcher’s called “glutathione-insulin transhydrogenase” (GIT). Later, the enzyme in question was found to be of the protein disulfide-isomerase family, leading to some ambiguity in the nomenclature.

This enzyme belongs to the family of oxidoreductases, specifically those acting on a sulfur group of donors with a disulfide as acceptor. The systematic name of this enzyme class is glutathione:protein-disulfide oxidoreductase. Other names in common use include glutathione-insulin transhydrogenase, insulin reductase, reductase, protein disulfide (glutathione), protein disulfide transhydrogenase, glutathione-protein disulfide oxidoreductase, protein disulfide reductase (glutathione), GSH-insulin transhydrogenase, protein-disulfide interchange enzyme, protein-disulfide isomerase/oxidoreductase, thiol:protein-disulfide oxidoreductase, and thiol-protein disulphide oxidoreductase. This enzyme participates in glutathione metabolism.

== Structural studies ==
As of late 2007, only one structure has been solved for this class of enzymes, with the PDB accession code PDB: 2IJY.
