= Prostate cancer associated transcript 18 (non-protein coding) =

Protein found in the human body

PCAT18

Identifiers
- Aliases: PCAT18, LINC01092, prostate cancer associated transcript 18 (non-protein coding), prostate cancer associated transcript 18
- External IDs: OMIM: 617647; GeneCards: PCAT18; OMA:PCAT18 - orthologs

Gene location (Human)
Chr.	Chromosome 18 (human)
Band	18q11.2	Start	26,687,621 bp
Band	18q11.2	End	26,703,638 bp
RNA expression pattern
Bgee	Human / Mouse (ortholog); Top expressed in: buccal mucosa cell; minor salivary glands; body of stomach; fundus; right lobe of thyroid gland; left lobe of thyroid gland; prostate; gallbladder; right lobe of liver; Achilles tendon / n/a; More reference expression data
BioGPS	n/a
Orthologs
Species	Human	Mouse
Entrez	728606	n/a
Ensembl	ENSG00000265369	n/a
UniProt	n a	n/a
RefSeq (mRNA)	n/a	n/a
RefSeq (protein)	n/a	n/a
Location (UCSC)	Chr 18: 26.69 – 26.7 Mb	n/a
PubMed search		n/a
- Wikidata
View/Edit Human

Prostate cancer associated transcript 18 (non-protein coding) is a protein that in humans is encoded by the PCAT18 gene.

This gene was described by Crea et al as a prostate cancer-specific transcript activated by the androgen receptor.
