= INO80 complex subunit C =

Protein-coding gene in the species Homo sapiens

INO80C

Identifiers
- Aliases: INO80C, C18orf37, IES6, hIes6, INO80 complex subunit C
- External IDs: MGI: 2443014; GeneCards: INO80C

Gene location (Human)
Chr.	Chromosome 18 (human)
Band	18q12.2	Start	35,452,230 bp
Band	18q12.2	End	35,497,979 bp

Gene location (Mouse)
Chr.	Chromosome 18 (mouse)
Band	18|18 A2	Start	24,237,814 bp
Band	18|18 A2	End	24,255,010 bp
RNA expression pattern
Bgee	Human / Mouse (ortholog); Top expressed in: left testis; right testis; amniotic fluid; mucosa of pharynx; buccal mucosa cell; pancreatic epithelial cell; mucosa of ileum; skin of abdomen; anterior pituitary; oral cavity / Top expressed in: spermatocyte; otic placode; spermatid; saccule; otic vesicle; yolk sac; morula; tail of embryo; superior cervical ganglion; muscle of thigh; More reference expression data
BioGPS	n/a
Gene ontology
Molecular function	molecular function
Cellular component	nucleus; MLL1 complex; Ino80 complex; fibrillar center; nucleoplasm
Biological process	regulation of transcription, DNA-templated; DNA recombination; transcription, DNA-templated; cellular response to DNA damage stimulus; chromatin remodeling; DNA repair; protein deubiquitination; biological process
Sources:Amigo / QuickGO
Orthologs
Databases	NCBI: entry; OMA: entry
Species	Human	Mouse
Entrez	125476	225280
Ensembl	ENSG00000153391	ENSMUSG00000047989
UniProt	Q6PI98	Q8BHA0
RefSeq (mRNA)	NM_001098817; NM_001308064; NM_194281	NM_172625
RefSeq (protein)	NP_001092287; NP_001294993; NP_919257	NP_766213
Location (UCSC)	Chr 18: 35.45 – 35.5 Mb	Chr 18: 24.24 – 24.26 Mb
PubMed search
- Wikidata
View/Edit Human	View/Edit Mouse

INO80 complex subunit C is a protein that in humans is encoded by the INO80C gene.

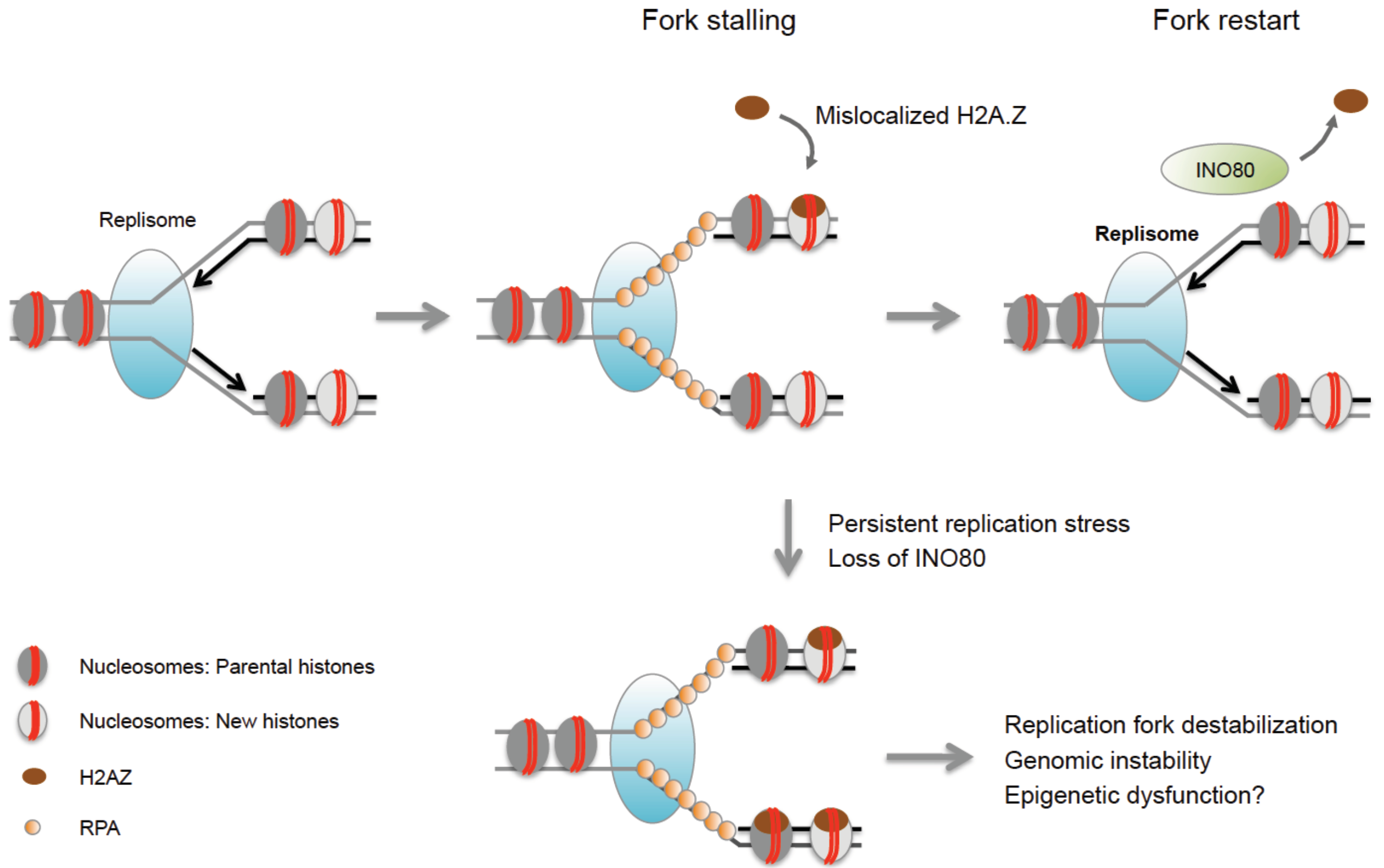
INO80 stabilizes replication forks and counteracts mislocalization of H2A.Z
