= TRAPPC8 =

Protein-coding gene in the species Homo sapiens

Identifiers
- Aliases: TRAPPC8, GSG1, HsT2706, KIAA1012, TRS85, trafficking protein particle complex 8, trafficking protein particle complex subunit 8
- External IDs: OMIM: 614136; MGI: 2443008; GeneCards: TRAPPC8

Gene location (Human)
Chr.	Chromosome 18 (human)
Band	18q12.1	Start	31,829,197 bp
Band	18q12.1	End	31,953,136 bp

Gene location (Mouse)
Chr.	Chromosome 18 (mouse)
Band	18|18 A2	Start	20,950,280 bp
Band	18|18 A2	End	21,029,150 bp
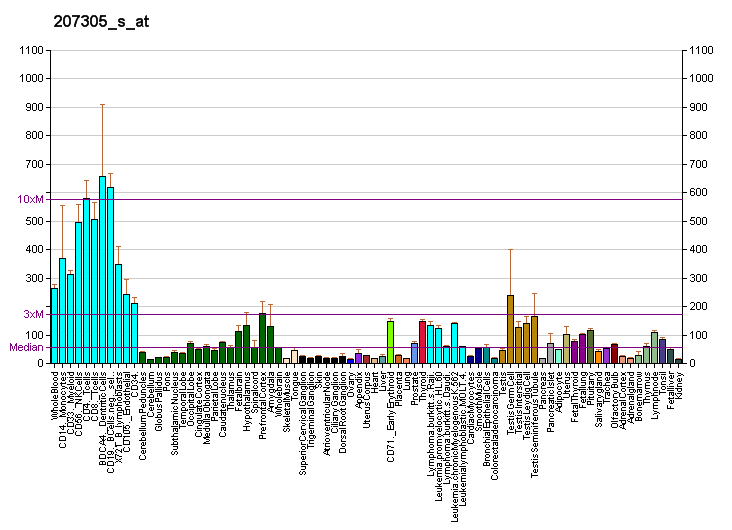
RNA expression pattern
Bgee	Human / Mouse (ortholog); Top expressed in: hair follicle; gonad; jejunal mucosa; caput epididymis; sperm; superior surface of tongue; renal medulla; cardia; bronchial epithelial cell; corpus epididymis / Top expressed in: superior cervical ganglion; otolith organ; utricle; hand; retinal pigment epithelium; skin of abdomen; primary oocyte; ciliary body; cumulus cell; transitional epithelium of urinary bladder; More reference expression data
BioGPS	More reference expression data
Gene ontology
Molecular function	protein binding
Cellular component	phagophore assembly site; cytoplasmic vesicle; TRAPPIII protein complex; Golgi apparatus; cytosol; TRAPP complex
Biological process	protein localization to phagophore assembly site; autophagy of peroxisome; cytoplasm to vacuole transport by the Cvt pathway; autophagy of nucleus; endoplasmic reticulum to Golgi vesicle-mediated transport; vesicle-mediated transport; Golgi organization; autophagosome assembly
Sources:Amigo / QuickGO
Orthologs
Databases	NCBI: entry; OMA: entry
Species	Human	Mouse
Entrez	22878	75964
Ensembl	ENSG00000153339	ENSMUSG00000033382
UniProt	Q9Y2L5	n/a
RefSeq (mRNA)	NM_014939	NM_029491; NM_177038; NM_001361188; NM_001379370
RefSeq (protein)	NP_055754	n/a
Location (UCSC)	Chr 18: 31.83 – 31.95 Mb	Chr 18: 20.95 – 21.03 Mb
PubMed search
- Wikidata
View/Edit Human	View/Edit Mouse

Trafficking protein particle complex subunit 8 is a protein that in humans is encoded by the TRAPPC8 gene (previously KIAA1012). The TRAPPC8 protein is part of the TRAPP complex. It is involved in the organization of the golgi apparatus and in the production of collagen.
