= Zinc finger and scan domain containing 30 =

Protein-coding gene in the species Homo sapiens

ZSCAN30

Identifiers
- Aliases: ZSCAN30, ZNF-WYM, ZNF397OS, ZNF917, zinc finger and SCAN domain containing 30
- External IDs: MGI: 2685600; GeneCards: ZSCAN30

Gene location (Human)
Chr.	Chromosome 18 (human)
Band	18q12.2	Start	35,251,058 bp
Band	18q12.2	End	35,290,245 bp
RNA expression pattern
Bgee	Human / Mouse (ortholog); Top expressed in: sural nerve; corpus callosum; cerebellar hemisphere; right hemisphere of cerebellum; internal globus pallidus; deltoid muscle; tendon of biceps brachii; atrium; right auricle of heart; cardiac muscle tissue of right atrium / n/a; More reference expression data
BioGPS	n/a
Gene ontology
Molecular function	DNA binding; metal ion binding; nucleic acid binding; DNA-binding transcription factor activity; DNA-binding transcription factor activity, RNA polymerase II-specific
Cellular component	nucleus
Biological process	regulation of transcription, DNA-templated; transcription, DNA-templated; regulation of transcription by RNA polymerase II
Sources:Amigo / QuickGO
Orthologs
Databases	NCBI: entry; OMA: entry
Species	Human	Mouse
Entrez	100101467	328918
Ensembl	ENSG00000186814	n/a
UniProt	Q86W11	Q149X8
RefSeq (mRNA)	NM_001112734; NM_001166012; NM_001288711	NM_001080810
RefSeq (protein)	NP_001106205; NP_001159484; NP_001275640	NP_001357862; NP_001357863; NP_001357864; NP_001357865; NP_001357866
Location (UCSC)	Chr 18: 35.25 – 35.29 Mb	n/a
PubMed search
- Wikidata
View/Edit Human	View/Edit Mouse

Zinc finger and SCAN domain containing 30 is a protein that in humans is encoded by the ZSCAN30 gene.
