= DIPK1B =

Human gene

Identifiers
- Aliases: DIPK1B, C9orf136, pp6977, family with sequence similarity 69 member B, divergent protein kinase domain 1B, FAM69B
- External IDs: OMIM: 614543; MGI: 1927576; GeneCards: DIPK1B

Gene location (Human)
Chr.	Chromosome 9 (human)
Band	9q34.3	Start	136,712,572 bp
Band	9q34.3	End	136,724,742 bp

Gene location (Mouse)
Chr.	Chromosome 2 (mouse)
Band	2|2 A3	Start	26,518,469 bp
Band	2|2 A3	End	26,526,509 bp
RNA expression pattern
Bgee	Human / Mouse (ortholog); Top expressed in: lateral nuclear group of thalamus; tendon of biceps brachii; right hemisphere of cerebellum; apex of heart; endothelial cell; right frontal lobe; right auricle of heart; middle temporal gyrus; cingulate gyrus; anterior cingulate cortex / Top expressed in: facial motor nucleus; perirhinal cortex; entorhinal cortex; choroid plexus of fourth ventricle; dentate gyrus of hippocampal formation granule cell; cerebellar cortex; dorsal tegmental nucleus; primary visual cortex; medulla oblongata; CA3 field; More reference expression data
BioGPS	n/a
Orthologs
Databases	NCBI: entry; OMA: entry
Species	Human	Mouse
Entrez	138311	56279
Ensembl	ENSG00000165716	ENSMUSG00000036186
UniProt	Q5VUD6	Q99ML4
RefSeq (mRNA)	NM_152421	NM_019833
RefSeq (protein)	NP_689634	NP_062807
Location (UCSC)	Chr 9: 136.71 – 136.72 Mb	Chr 2: 26.52 – 26.53 Mb
PubMed search
- Wikidata
View/Edit Human	View/Edit Mouse

DIPK1B or divergent protein kinase domain 1B is a protein that in humans is coded by the DIPK1B gene. It is a member of the FAM69 family, which consists of three members across all vertebrates other than fish. It is also known as FAM69B.

== Gene ==
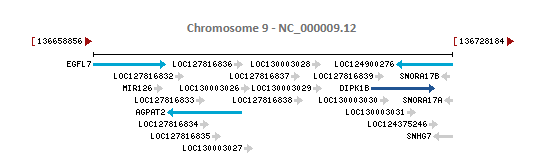
DIPK1B and its surrounding genes on Chromosome 9.

The DIPK1B gene is found on human chromosome 9, in the 9q34.3 band. The gene is located on the plus strand and spans 12,275 bases. The gene contains five exons. It is a member of FAM69, a family of genes with three members, DIPK1A, DIPK1B, and DIPK1C. This family is present in all vertebrates, with slight differences in fish, and orthologs of highly conserved structure are found in all metazoa.

== Transcripts ==
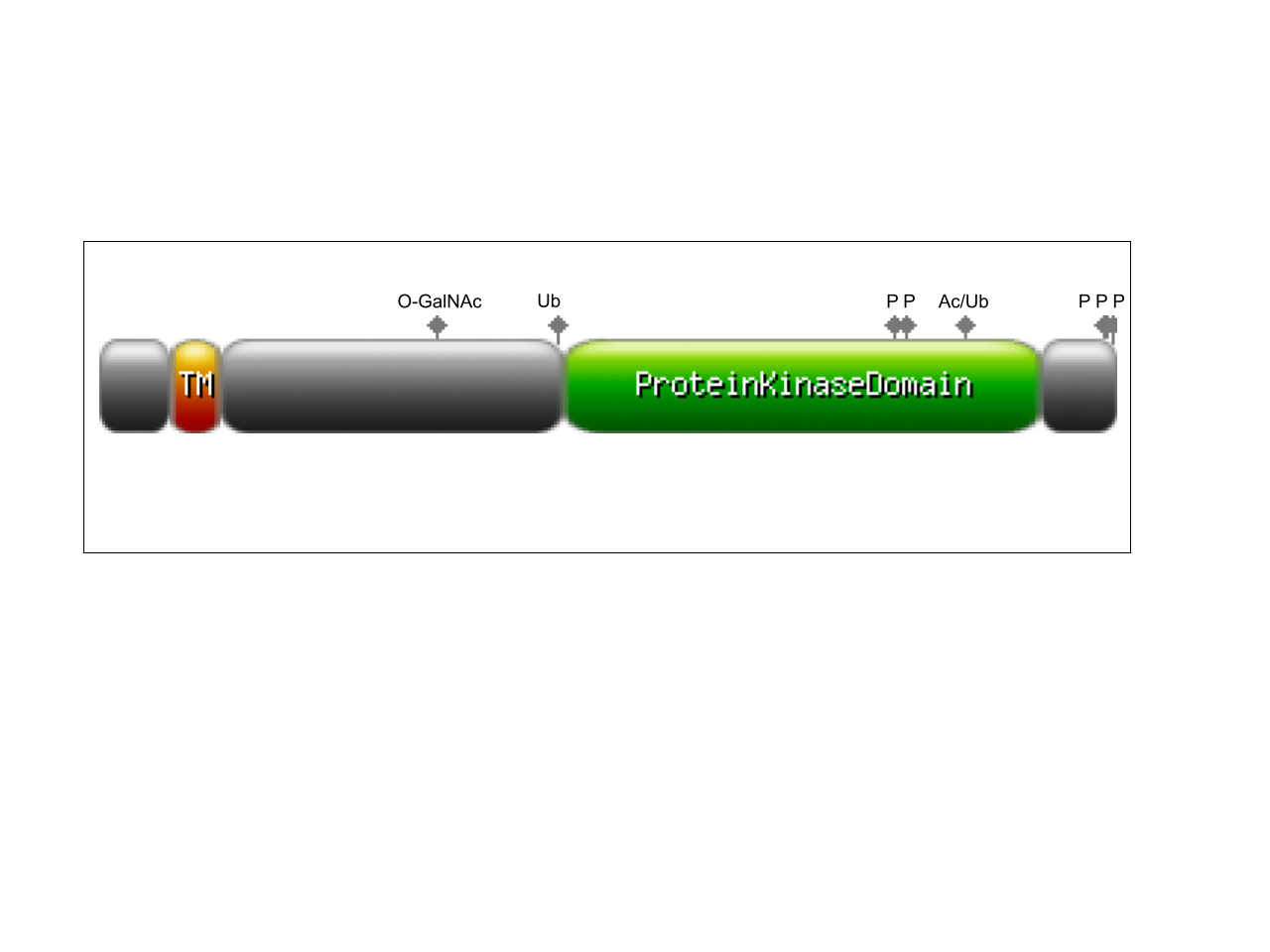
DIPK1B Protein with notated post-translational modifications and domains.

In humans there is only one known DIPK1B transcript. The mRNA transcript of DIPK1B is 2358 bases long, and contains all five exons of the DIPK1B gene.

== Protein ==
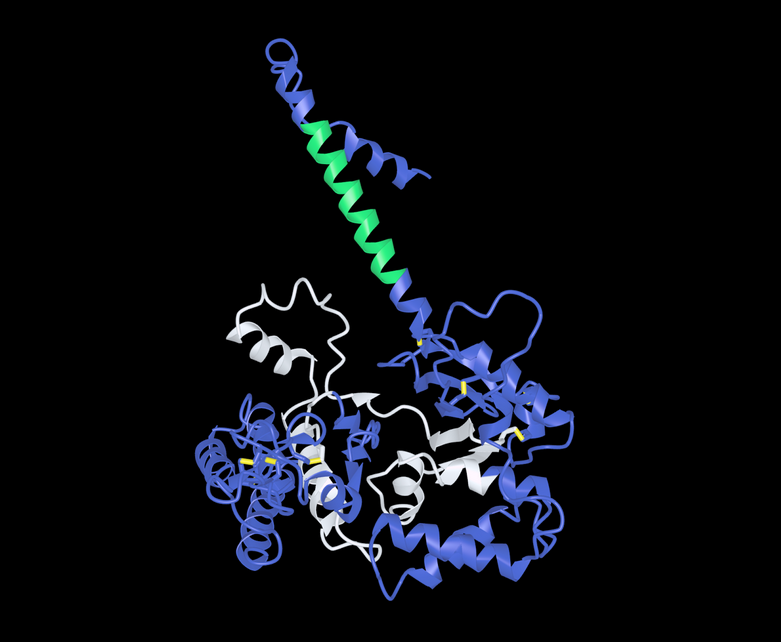
Structure of DIPK1B determined by AlphaFold and annotated in iCn3D. The transmembrane domain is shown in green and the protein kinase domain in white. Predicted disulfide bonds are shown in yellow.

Human DIPK1B has only one isoform. The resultant protein is 431 amino acids long, has an isoelectric point of 9, and has a predicted molecular weight of 48.6 kDa. DIPK1B contains two distinct domains, a transmembrane domain and a protein kinase domain.

== Expression ==
DIPK1B exhibits variable ubiquitous expression at moderate to high levels. Expression in the brain, heart, and lung is notably higher than in other tissues.

== Regulation ==
DIPK1B is localized to the membrane of the endoplasmic reticulum. It is expected to undergo a number of post-translational modifications, including o-linked glycosylation, phosphorylation, ubiquitination, and acetylation.

== Homology ==
DIPK1B Orthologs
Genus and Species	Common Name	Taxonomic Group	Date of Divergence (MYA)	Accession Number	Sequence Length (aa)	Sequence Identity to Human Protein (%)	Sequence Similarity to Human Protein (%)
Homo sapiens	Humans	Primates	0	NP_689634	431	100	100
Gorilla gorilla gorilla	Gorilla	Primates	8.6	XP_004048941.2	431	99.5	99.5
Desmodus rotundus	Vampire bat	Mammals	94	XP_053775135	435	84.9	90.7
Dromiciops gliroides	Monito del monte	Marsupials	160	XP_043845610.1	431	71.2	83.5
Gopherus flavomarginatus	Bolson tortoise	Reptiles	319	XP_050782714.1	431	68.2	82.6
Tiliqua scincoides	Common blue-tongued skink	Reptiles	319	XP_066466737.1	431	66.8	81.4
Varanus komodoensis	Komodo dragon	Reptiles	319	XP_044309118.1	431	65.7	90
Cyrtonyx montezumae	Montezuma quail	Birds	319	XP_065593300.1	431	67.5	82.6
Gallus gallus	Chicken	Birds	319	XP_415423	431	67.3	82.4
Taeniopygia guttata	Australian zebra finch	Birds	319	XP_002199526.4	431	66.1	81.7
Geothlypis trichas	Common yellowthroat	Birds	319	KAL9827061.1	431	65.9	82.4
Ambystoma mexicanum	Axolotl	Amphibians	352	XP_069465698.1	431	67.5	81
Ascaphus truei	Tailed Frog	Amphibians	352	XP_075435024	431	66.1	82.6
Xenopus laevis	African clawed frog	Amphibians	352	XP_018088073.1	431	62.9	80.3
Protopterus annectens	West African Lungfish	Fish	408	XP_043914470	431	65.4	82.4
Hypanus sabinus	Atlantic stingray	Fish	462	XP_059850265.1	431	61.5	80.3
Callorhinchus milii	Australian ghostshark	Fish	462	XP_042193771.1	431	60.8	78.4
Amblyraja radiata	Thorny skate	Fish	462	XP_032904599	431	58.9	79.1
Magallana gigas	Pacific Oyster	Mollusks	686	XP_011453093.2	438	23.7	40
Anopheles gambiae	Mosquito	Insects	686	XP_061498526	427	23	37.3

== Function ==
DIPK1B has been shown to interact with SAT1 and SLC39A12.
