= CFAP53 =

Protein-coding gene in humans

Identifiers
- Aliases: CFAP53, CCDC11, HTX6, cilia and flagella associated protein 53
- External IDs: OMIM: 614759; MGI: 1921703; GeneCards: CFAP53

Gene location (Human)
Chr.	Chromosome 18 (human)
Band	18q21.1	Start	50,227,193 bp
Band	18q21.1	End	50,266,495 bp

Gene location (Mouse)
Chr.	Chromosome 18 (mouse)
Band	18|18 E2	Start	74,416,161 bp
Band	18|18 E2	End	74,493,057 bp
RNA expression pattern
Bgee	Human / Mouse (ortholog); Top expressed in: bronchial epithelial cell; left testis; sperm; right uterine tube; right testis; mucosa of paranasal sinus; buccal mucosa cell; olfactory zone of nasal mucosa; epithelium of nasopharynx; testicle / Top expressed in: zygote; seminiferous tubule; secondary oocyte; otolith organ; utricle; spermatid; primary oocyte; spermatocyte; Epithelium of choroid plexus; embryo; More reference expression data
BioGPS	n/a
Gene ontology
Molecular function	protein binding
Cellular component	cell projection; cilium; cellular component; extracellular region
Biological process	cilium movement; determination of left/right symmetry; cilium assembly; epithelial cilium movement involved in determination of left/right asymmetry; multicellular organism development
Sources:Amigo / QuickGO
Orthologs
Databases	NCBI: entry; OMA: entry
Species	Human	Mouse
Entrez	220136	74453
Ensembl	ENSG00000172361	ENSMUSG00000035394
UniProt	Q96M91	Q9D439
RefSeq (mRNA)	NM_145020	NM_028948
RefSeq (protein)	NP_659457	NP_083224
Location (UCSC)	Chr 18: 50.23 – 50.27 Mb	Chr 18: 74.42 – 74.49 Mb
PubMed search
- Wikidata
View/Edit Human	View/Edit Mouse

Cilia and flagella associated protein 53 is a protein that in humans is encoded by the CFAP53 gene.

== Function ==
This gene belongs to the CFAP53 family. It was found to be differentially expressed by the ciliated cells of frog epidermis and in skin fibroblasts from human. Mutations in this gene are associated with visceral heterotaxy-6, which implicates this gene in determination of left-right asymmetric patterning.
