= CABLES1 =

Protein-coding gene in humans

Identifiers
- Aliases: CABLES1, CABL1, CABLES, HsT2563, IK3-1, Cdk5 and Abl enzyme substrate 1
- External IDs: OMIM: 609194; MGI: 1927065; HomoloGene: 11097; GeneCards: CABLES1; OMA:CABLES1 - orthologs

Gene location (Human)
Chr.	Chromosome 18 (human)
Band	18q11.2	Start	23,134,564 bp
Band	18q11.2	End	23,260,470 bp

Gene location (Mouse)
Chr.	Chromosome 18 (mouse)
Band	18|18 A1	Start	11,972,277 bp
Band	18|18 A1	End	12,078,687 bp
RNA expression pattern
Bgee	Human / Mouse (ortholog); Top expressed in: putamen; nucleus accumbens; caudate nucleus; internal globus pallidus; external globus pallidus; amygdala; pars reticulata; right frontal lobe; entorhinal cortex; cingulate gyrus / Top expressed in: habenula; cumulus cell; lumbar subsegment of spinal cord; nucleus of stria terminalis; lacrimal gland; otic vesicle; substantia nigra; central gray substance of midbrain; Paneth cell; suprachiasmatic nucleus; More reference expression data
BioGPS	n/a
Gene ontology
Molecular function	protein binding
Cellular component	cytoplasm; cytosol; nucleus
Biological process	cell cycle; regulation of cell cycle; cell division; nervous system development
Sources:Amigo / QuickGO
Orthologs
Species	Human	Mouse
Entrez	91768	63955
Ensembl	ENSG00000134508	ENSMUSG00000040957
UniProt	Q8TDN4	Q9ESJ1
RefSeq (mRNA)	NM_001100619; NM_001256438; NM_138375	NM_001146287; NM_022021
RefSeq (protein)	NP_001094089; NP_001243367; NP_612384	NP_001139759; NP_071304
Location (UCSC)	Chr 18: 23.13 – 23.26 Mb	Chr 18: 11.97 – 12.08 Mb
PubMed search
- Wikidata
View/Edit Human	View/Edit Mouse

CDK5 and ABL1 enzyme substrate 1 is a protein that in humans is encoded by the CABLES1 gene.

CABLES1 is a cyclin-dependent kinase (CDK)-binding protein that plays a role in proliferation and/or cell differentiation. [supplied by OMIM]. It is a tumor suppressor gene which losing it (by mutations, knockout, knockdown or inactivation) may lead to colorectal cancer CRC.
