= Zinc finger protein 516 =

Protein found in humans

ZNF516

Identifiers
- Aliases: ZNF516, HsT287, zinc finger protein 516
- External IDs: OMIM: 615114; MGI: 2443957; GeneCards: ZNF516

Gene location (Human)
| Chr. | Chromosome 18 (human) |
| Band | 18q23 | Start | 76,357,682 bp |
| Band | 18q23 | End | 76,495,242 bp |

Gene location (Mouse)
| Chr. | Chromosome 18 (mouse) |
| Band | 18|18 E3 | Start | 82,928,788 bp |
| Band | 18|18 E3 | End | 83,023,439 bp |
RNA expression pattern
| Bgee | Human / Mouse (ortholog); Top expressed in: stromal cell of endometrium; canal of the cervix; left testis; body of uterus; right testis; left ovary; right uterine tube; testicle; ectocervix; right ovary / Top expressed in: hand; granulocyte; ascending aorta; aortic valve; islet of Langerhans; trigeminal ganglion; Gonadal ridge; genital tubercle; mandibular prominence; abdominal wall; More reference expression data |
| BioGPS | n/a |
Gene ontology
| Molecular function | DNA-binding transcription factor activity; sequence-specific DNA binding; DNA binding; cis-regulatory region sequence-specific DNA binding; metal ion binding; nucleic acid binding; DNA-binding transcription factor activity, RNA polymerase II-specific |
| Cellular component | nucleus |
| Biological process | multicellular organism development; positive regulation of transcription, DNA-templated; response to cold; adipose tissue development; regulation of transcription, DNA-templated; transcription by RNA polymerase II; signal transduction; brown fat cell differentiation; transcription, DNA-templated; regulation of transcription by RNA polymerase II; positive regulation of cold-induced thermogenesis |
Sources:Amigo / QuickGO
Orthologs
| Databases | NCBI: entry; OMA: entry |
| Species | Human | Mouse |
| Entrez | 9658 | 329003 |
| Ensembl | ENSG00000101493 | ENSMUSG00000058881 |
| UniProt | Q92618 | Q7TSH3 |
| RefSeq (mRNA) | NM_014643 | NM_001177464; NM_183033 |
| RefSeq (protein) | NP_055458 | NP_001170935; NP_898854 |
| Location (UCSC) | Chr 18: 76.36 – 76.5 Mb | Chr 18: 82.93 – 83.02 Mb |
| PubMed search |
- Wikidata
| View/Edit Human | View/Edit Mouse |

Zinc finger protein 516 is a protein that in humans is encoded by the ZNF516 gene.

== Function ==
Zinc-finger proteins bind nucleic acids and play important roles in various cellular functions, including cell proliferation, differentiation, and apoptosis. This gene encodes a zinc-finger protein, and belongs to the Krüppel C2H2-type zinc-finger protein family. It may be involved in transcriptional regulation.
