= RP11-267C16.1 =

Protein-coding gene in humans

LINC01630

Identifiers
- Aliases: LINC01630, RP11-267C16.1, long intergenic non-protein coding RNA 1630
- External IDs: GeneCards: LINC01630; OMA:LINC01630 - orthologs

Gene location (Human)
Chr.	Chromosome 18 (human)
Band	18q21.2	Start	51,346,249 bp
Band	18q21.2	End	51,643,939 bp
RNA expression pattern
Bgee	Human / Mouse (ortholog); Top expressed in: corpus callosum; C1 segment; substantia nigra; hippocampus proper; putamen; testicle; amygdala; gonad; hypothalamus; primary visual cortex / n/a; More reference expression data
BioGPS	n/a
Orthologs
Species	Human	Mouse
Entrez	100287225	n/a
Ensembl	ENSG00000227115	n/a
UniProt	n a	n/a
RefSeq (mRNA)	n/a	n/a
RefSeq (protein)	n/a	n/a
Location (UCSC)	Chr 18: 51.35 – 51.64 Mb	n/a
PubMed search		n/a
- Wikidata
View/Edit Human

Uncharacterized LOC100287225 is a protein that in humans is encoded by the RP11-267C16.1 gene.
