= Sialic acid binding Ig-like lectin 15 =

Protein-coding gene in the species Homo sapiens

SIGLEC15

Identifiers
- Aliases: SIGLEC15, CD33L3, HsT1361, SIGLEC-15, Sialic acid binding ig-like lectin 15, sialic acid binding Ig like lectin 15
- External IDs: OMIM: 618105; MGI: 3646642; GeneCards: SIGLEC15

Gene location (Human)
Chr.	Chromosome 18 (human)
Band	18q12.3	Start	45,825,675 bp
Band	18q12.3	End	45,844,094 bp

Gene location (Mouse)
Chr.	Chromosome 18 (mouse)
Band	18|18 E3	Start	78,086,829 bp
Band	18|18 E3	End	78,100,610 bp
RNA expression pattern
Bgee	Human / Mouse (ortholog); Top expressed in: jejunal mucosa; buccal mucosa cell; periodontal fiber; pancreatic ductal cell; tibia; duodenum; amniotic fluid; mononuclear cell; monocyte; lactiferous duct / Top expressed in: embryo; embryo; ovary; urinary bladder; thymus; More reference expression data
BioGPS	n/a
Orthologs
Databases	NCBI: entry; OMA: entry
Species	Human	Mouse
Entrez	284266	620235
Ensembl	ENSG00000197046	ENSMUSG00000091055
UniProt	Q6ZMC9	A7E1W8
RefSeq (mRNA)	NM_213602	NM_001101038
RefSeq (protein)	NP_998767	NP_001094508
Location (UCSC)	Chr 18: 45.83 – 45.84 Mb	Chr 18: 78.09 – 78.1 Mb
PubMed search
- Wikidata
View/Edit Human	View/Edit Mouse

Sialic acid binding Ig-like lectin 15 (Siglec-15) is a protein that in humans is encoded by the SIGLEC15 gene. Siglec-15 is predominately expressed on osteoclasts, elevated levels of Siglec- 15 in the bone metastatic niche can promote tumor-induced osteoclastogenesis as well as suppress antigen-specific T cell responses. Researchers demonstrated that antibody blockade of the Siglec-15/sialic acid glycol-immune checkpoint axis can act as a potential treatment for breast cancer bone metastasis.
