= PIGN (gene) =

Protein-coding gene in the species Homo sapiens

Identifiers
- Aliases: PIGN, MCAHS, MCAHS1, MCD4, MDC4, PIG-N, phosphatidylinositol glycan anchor biosynthesis class N
- External IDs: OMIM: 606097; MGI: 1351629; HomoloGene: 6330; GeneCards: PIGN; OMA:PIGN - orthologs

Gene location (Human)
Chr.	Chromosome 18 (human)
Band	18q21.33	Start	61,905,255 bp
Band	18q21.33	End	62,187,118 bp

Gene location (Mouse)
Chr.	Chromosome 1 (mouse)
Band	1|1 E2.1	Start	105,446,147 bp
Band	1|1 E2.1	End	105,591,402 bp
RNA expression pattern
Bgee	Human / Mouse (ortholog); Top expressed in: buccal mucosa cell; Achilles tendon; epithelium of colon; testicle; islet of Langerhans; rectum; Epithelium of choroid plexus; ventricular zone; skin of abdomen; gonad / Top expressed in: yolk sac; conjunctival fornix; vestibular sensory epithelium; spermatid; spermatocyte; ciliary body; urothelium; medullary collecting duct; lumbar subsegment of spinal cord; retinal pigment epithelium; More reference expression data
BioGPS	n/a
Gene ontology
Molecular function	catalytic activity; transferase activity; mannose-ethanolamine phosphotransferase activity
Cellular component	membrane; integral component of membrane; endoplasmic reticulum; endoplasmic reticulum membrane; cytosol; plasma membrane
Biological process	preassembly of GPI anchor in ER membrane; metabolism; GPI anchor biosynthetic process
Sources:Amigo / QuickGO
Orthologs
Species	Human	Mouse
Entrez	23556	27392
Ensembl	ENSG00000197563	ENSMUSG00000056536
UniProt	O95427	Q9R1S3
RefSeq (mRNA)	NM_012327; NM_176787	NM_013784
RefSeq (protein)	NP_036459; NP_789744	n/a
Location (UCSC)	Chr 18: 61.91 – 62.19 Mb	Chr 1: 105.45 – 105.59 Mb
PubMed search
- Wikidata
View/Edit Human	View/Edit Mouse

Phosphatidylinositol glycan anchor biosynthesis, class N is a protein that in humans is encoded by the PIGN gene.

== Function ==
This gene encodes a protein that is involved in glycosylphosphatidylinositol (GPI)-anchor biosynthesis. The GPI-anchor is a glycolipid found on many blood cells and serves to anchor proteins to the cell surface. This protein is expressed in the endoplasmic reticulum and transfers phosphoethanolamine (EtNP) to the first mannose of the GPI anchor.

== Clinical aspect ==
Mutations in PIGN cause Congenital Diaphragmatic Hernia.
