= Zinc finger protein 236 =

Protein found in humans

ZNF236

Identifiers
- Aliases: ZNF236, ZNF236A, ZNF236B, zinc finger protein 236
- External IDs: OMIM: 604760; MGI: 1926950; GeneCards: ZNF236

Gene location (Human)
Chr.	Chromosome 18 (human)
Band	18q23	Start	76,822,557 bp
Band	18q23	End	76,972,901 bp

Gene location (Mouse)
Chr.	Chromosome 18 (mouse)
Band	18 E3|18 56.26 cM	Start	82,611,718 bp
Band	18 E3|18 56.26 cM	End	82,711,008 bp
RNA expression pattern
Bgee	Human / Mouse (ortholog); Top expressed in: sural nerve; Achilles tendon; gingival epithelium; buccal mucosa cell; germinal epithelium; testicle; mucosa of urinary bladder; gonad; corpus callosum; olfactory bulb / Top expressed in: superior cervical ganglion; cumulus cell; granulocyte; otolith organ; utricle; zygote; blood; neural layer of retina; hand; genital tubercle; More reference expression data
BioGPS	n/a
Gene ontology
Molecular function	DNA binding; metal ion binding; nucleic acid binding; DNA-binding transcription factor activity, RNA polymerase II-specific; DNA-binding transcription factor activity
Cellular component	nucleus
Biological process	regulation of transcription, DNA-templated; transcription, DNA-templated; cellular response to glucose stimulus; regulation of transcription by RNA polymerase II
Sources:Amigo / QuickGO
Orthologs
Databases	NCBI: entry; OMA: entry
Species	Human	Mouse
Entrez	7776	329002
Ensembl	ENSG00000130856	ENSMUSG00000041258
UniProt	Q9UL36	n/a
RefSeq (mRNA)	NM_001306089; NM_007345	NM_177832; NM_001374229
RefSeq (protein)	NP_001293018; NP_031371	n/a
Location (UCSC)	Chr 18: 76.82 – 76.97 Mb	Chr 18: 82.61 – 82.71 Mb
PubMed search
- Wikidata
View/Edit Human	View/Edit Mouse

Zinc finger protein 236 is a protein that in humans is encoded by the ZNF236 gene.
