= Zinc finger protein 532 =

Protein found in humans

ZNF532

Identifiers
- Aliases: ZNF532, zinc finger protein 532
- External IDs: MGI: 3036282; GeneCards: ZNF532

Gene location (Human)
Chr.	Chromosome 18 (human)
Band	18q21.32	Start	58,862,600 bp
Band	18q21.32	End	58,986,480 bp

Gene location (Mouse)
Chr.	Chromosome 18 (mouse)
Band	18|18 E1	Start	65,712,983 bp
Band	18|18 E1	End	65,822,514 bp
RNA expression pattern
Bgee	Human / Mouse (ortholog); Top expressed in: ganglionic eminence; sural nerve; ventricular zone; corpus callosum; Achilles tendon; right hemisphere of cerebellum; Descending thoracic aorta; olfactory bulb; ascending aorta; prostate / Top expressed in: tail of embryo; zygote; ganglionic eminence; genital tubercle; maxillary prominence; superior cervical ganglion; ventricular zone; mandibular prominence; neural tube; secondary oocyte; More reference expression data
BioGPS	n/a
Gene ontology
Molecular function	DNA binding; metal ion binding; nucleic acid binding; DNA-binding transcription factor activity, RNA polymerase II-specific
Cellular component	nucleus
Biological process	regulation of transcription, DNA-templated; transcription, DNA-templated; regulation of transcription by RNA polymerase II
Sources:Amigo / QuickGO
Orthologs
Databases	NCBI: entry; OMA: entry
Species	Human	Mouse
Entrez	55205	328977
Ensembl	ENSG00000074657	ENSMUSG00000042439
UniProt	Q9HCE3	Q6NXK2
RefSeq (mRNA)	NM_018181; NM_001318726; NM_001318727; NM_001318728; NM_001353525 NM_001353526; NM_001353527; NM_001353528; NM_001353529; NM_001353530; NM_001353531; NM_001353532; NM_001353533; NM_001353534; NM_001353535; NM_001353536; NM_001353537; NM_001353538; NM_001375912; NM_001375913	NM_207255; NM_001361051; NM_001361052; NM_001361053
RefSeq (protein)	NP_001305655; NP_001305656; NP_001305657; NP_060651; NP_001340454 NP_001340455; NP_001340456; NP_001340457; NP_001340458; NP_001340459; NP_001340460; NP_001340461; NP_001340462; NP_001340463; NP_001340464; NP_001340465; NP_001340466; NP_001340467; NP_001362841; NP_001362842	NP_997138; NP_001347980; NP_001347981; NP_001347982
Location (UCSC)	Chr 18: 58.86 – 58.99 Mb	Chr 18: 65.71 – 65.82 Mb
PubMed search
- Wikidata
View/Edit Human	View/Edit Mouse

Zinc finger protein 532 is a protein that in humans is encoded by the ZNF532 gene.
