= MIR133A1 =

Non-coding RNA in the species Homo sapiens

Identifiers
- Aliases: MIR133A1, MIRN133A1, mir-133a-1, microRNA 133a-1
- External IDs: OMIM: 610254; GeneCards: MIR133A1; OMA:MIR133A1 - orthologs

Gene location (Human)
Chr.	Chromosome 18 (human)
Band	18q11.2	Start	21,825,698 bp
Band	18q11.2	End	21,825,785 bp
RNA expression pattern
Bgee	Human / Mouse (ortholog); Top expressed in: anterior cingulate cortex; body of stomach; left ventricle; left ovary; ascending aorta; subcutaneous adipose tissue; apex of heart; right frontal lobe; skin of leg; skin of abdomen / n/a; More reference expression data
BioGPS	n/a
Orthologs
Species	Human	Mouse
Entrez	406922	n/a
Ensembl	ENSG00000283927	n/a
UniProt	n a	n/a
RefSeq (mRNA)	n/a	n/a
RefSeq (protein)	n/a	n/a
Location (UCSC)	Chr 18: 21.83 – 21.83 Mb	n/a
PubMed search		n/a
- Wikidata
View/Edit Human

MicroRNA 133a-1 is a MicroRNA that in humans is encoded by the MIR133A1 gene, and is a known extracellular RNA (exRNA).

== Function ==
microRNAs (miRNAs) are short (20-24 nt) non-coding RNAs that are involved in post-transcriptional regulation of gene expression in multicellular organisms by affecting both the stability and translation of mRNAs. miRNAs are transcribed by RNA polymerase II as part of capped and polyadenylated primary transcripts (pri-miRNAs) that can be either protein-coding or non-coding. The primary transcript is cleaved by the Drosha ribonuclease III enzyme to produce an approximately 70-nt stem-loop precursor miRNA (pre-miRNA), which is further cleaved by the cytoplasmic Dicer ribonuclease to generate the mature miRNA and antisense miRNA star (miRNA*) products. The mature miRNA is incorporated into a RNA-induced silencing complex (RISC), which recognizes target mRNAs through imperfect base pairing with the miRNA and most commonly results in translational inhibition or destabilization of the target mRNA. The RefSeq represents the predicted microRNA stem-loop.
