= TXNDC12 =

Protein-coding gene in humans

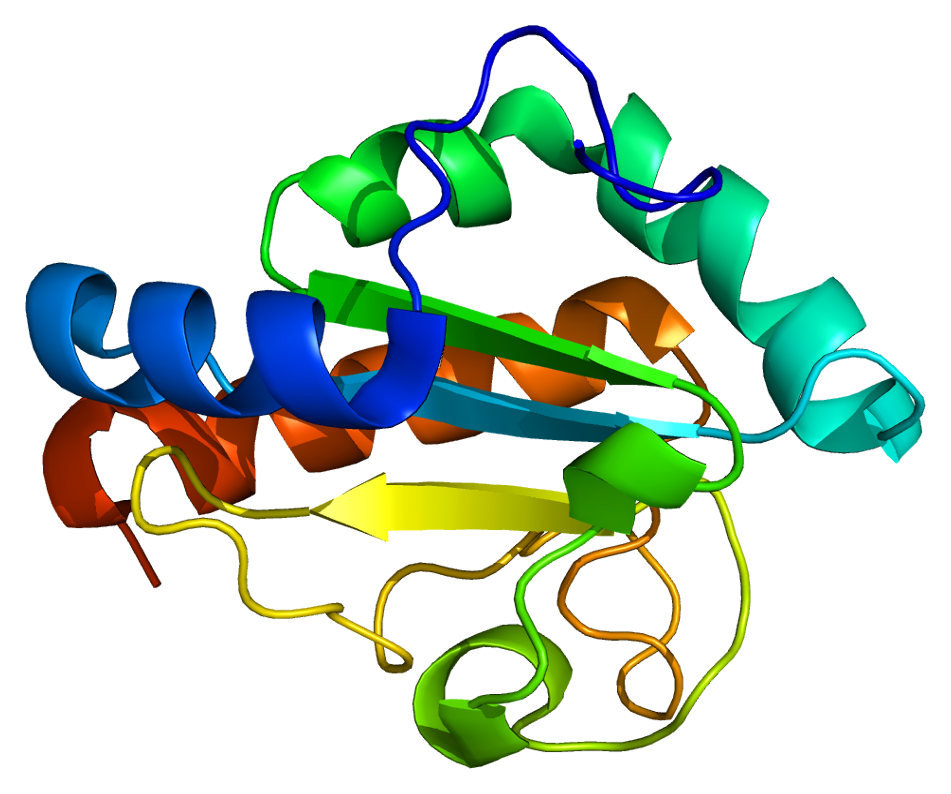

Identifiers
- Aliases: TXNDC12, AG1, AGR1, ERP16, ERP18, ERP19, PDIA16, TLP19, hAG-1, hTLP19, thioredoxin domain containing 12
- External IDs: OMIM: 609448; MGI: 1913323; GeneCards: TXNDC12
Available structures
PDB	Ortholog search: PDBe RCSB
PDB	List of PDB id codes 1SEN, 2K8V
Enzyme activity
EC #	BRENDA	ExPASy	KEGG	MetaCyc
1.8.4.2	↗	↗	↗	↗

Gene location (Human)
Chr.	Chromosome 1 (human)
Band	1p32.3	Start	52,020,131 bp
Band	1p32.3	End	52,055,191 bp

Gene location (Mouse)
Chr.	Chromosome 4 (mouse)
Band	4|4 C7	Start	108,691,798 bp
Band	4|4 C7	End	108,719,324 bp
RNA expression pattern
Bgee	Human / Mouse (ortholog); Top expressed in: monocyte; rectum; gonad; stromal cell of endometrium; body of pancreas; islet of Langerhans; ventricular zone; placenta; gallbladder; olfactory zone of nasal mucosa / Top expressed in: medial ganglionic eminence; spermatocyte; endocardial cushion; dermis; calvaria; epithelium of lens; atrium; efferent ductule; atrioventricular valve; yolk sac; More reference expression data
BioGPS	n/a
Gene ontology
Molecular function	oxidoreductase activity; protein-disulfide reductase (glutathione) activity; protein binding
Cellular component	endoplasmic reticulum lumen; endoplasmic reticulum
Biological process	negative regulation of endoplasmic reticulum stress-induced intrinsic apoptotic signaling pathway; cell redox homeostasis; cell differentiation; negative regulation of cell death
Sources:Amigo / QuickGO
Orthologs
Databases	NCBI: entry; OMA: entry
Species	Human	Mouse
Entrez	51060	66073
Ensembl	ENSG00000117862	ENSMUSG00000028567
UniProt	O95881	Q9CQU0
RefSeq (mRNA)	NM_015913	NM_025334
RefSeq (protein)	NP_056997	NP_079610
Location (UCSC)	Chr 1: 52.02 – 52.06 Mb	Chr 4: 108.69 – 108.72 Mb
PubMed search
- Wikidata
View/Edit Human	View/Edit Mouse

Thioredoxin domain-containing protein 12 is a protein that in humans is encoded by the TXNDC12 gene.

TXNDC12 belongs to the thioredoxin superfamily (see TXN; MIM 187700). Members of this superfamily possess a thioredoxin fold with a consensus active-site sequence (CxxC) and have roles in redox regulation, defense against oxidative stress, refolding of disulfide-containing proteins, and regulation of transcription factors (Liu et al., 2003).[supplied by OMIM]
