= CABYR =

Protein-coding gene in humans

Identifiers
- Aliases: CABYR, CABYRa, CABYRc, CABYRc/d, CABYRe, CBP86, CT88, FSP-2, FSP2, calcium binding tyrosine phosphorylation regulated
- External IDs: OMIM: 612135; MGI: 1918382; HomoloGene: 49299; GeneCards: CABYR; OMA:CABYR - orthologs

Gene location (Human)
Chr.	Chromosome 18 (human)
Band	18q11.2	Start	24,138,987 bp
Band	18q11.2	End	24,161,600 bp

Gene location (Mouse)
Chr.	Chromosome 18 (mouse)
Band	18|18 A1	Start	12,873,379 bp
Band	18|18 A1	End	12,888,317 bp
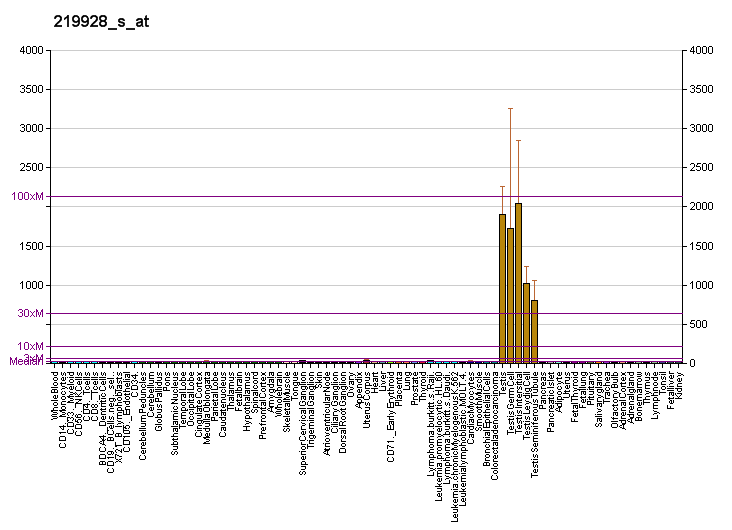
RNA expression pattern
Bgee	Human / Mouse (ortholog); Top expressed in: sperm; left testis; right testis; gonad; oocyte; right uterine tube; secondary oocyte; anterior pituitary; anterior cingulate cortex; testicle / Top expressed in: seminiferous tubule; spermatid; spermatocyte; primary visual cortex; ascending aorta; superior frontal gyrus; aortic valve; dentate gyrus of hippocampal formation granule cell; embryo; embryo; More reference expression data
BioGPS	More reference expression data
Gene ontology
Molecular function	SH3 domain binding; enzyme binding; calcium ion binding; protein binding; protein domain specific binding; metal ion binding; protein heterodimerization activity
Cellular component	cytoplasm; sperm principal piece; cell projection; motile cilium; cilium; sperm fibrous sheath; cytoskeleton; nucleus; sperm end piece; cytosol; extracellular region
Biological process	sperm capacitation; epithelial cilium movement involved in extracellular fluid movement
Sources:Amigo / QuickGO
Orthologs
Species	Human	Mouse
Entrez	26256	71132
Ensembl	ENSG00000154040	ENSMUSG00000024430
UniProt	O75952	Q9D424
RefSeq (mRNA)	NM_001308231; NM_012189; NM_138643; NM_138644; NM_153768 NM_153769; NM_153770	NM_001042418; NM_001042419; NM_001042420; NM_027687; NM_181731
RefSeq (protein)	NP_001295160; NP_036321; NP_619584; NP_619585; NP_722452 NP_722453; NP_722454; NP_001295160.1	NP_001035883; NP_001035884; NP_001035885; NP_081963; NP_859420
Location (UCSC)	Chr 18: 24.14 – 24.16 Mb	Chr 18: 12.87 – 12.89 Mb
PubMed search
- Wikidata
View/Edit Human	View/Edit Mouse

Calcium-binding tyrosine phosphorylation-regulated protein is a protein that in humans is encoded by the CABYR gene.

To reach fertilization competence, spermatozoa undergo a series of morphological and molecular maturational processes, termed capacitation, involving protein tyrosine phosphorylation and increased intracellular calcium. The protein encoded by this gene localizes to the principal piece of the sperm flagellum in association with the fibrous sheath and exhibits calcium-binding when phosphorylated during capacitation. A pseudogene on chromosome 3 has been identified for this gene. Transcript variants of this gene encode multiple protein isoforms. An additional transcript and isoform has not been fully characterized.
