= C18orf63 =

Protein-coding gene in the species Homo sapiens

Identifiers
- Aliases: C18orf63, DKFZP781G0119, chromosome 18 open reading frame 63
- External IDs: MGI: 4936900; GeneCards: C18orf63

Gene location (Human)
Chr.	Chromosome 18 (human)
Band	18q22.3	Start	74,315,839 bp
Band	18q22.3	End	74,359,189 bp

Gene location (Mouse)
Chr.	Chromosome 18 (mouse)
Band	18 E4|18 57.53 cM	Start	84,816,683 bp
Band	18 E4|18 57.53 cM	End	84,854,841 bp
RNA expression pattern
Bgee	Human / Mouse (ortholog); Top expressed in: testicle; right testis; left testis; gonad; right lung; upper lobe of left lung / Top expressed in: zygote; secondary oocyte; primary oocyte; spermatid; More reference expression data
BioGPS	n/a
Orthologs
Databases	NCBI: entry; OMA: entry
Species	Human	Mouse
Entrez	644041	100503964
Ensembl	ENSG00000206043	ENSMUSG00000117781
UniProt	Q68DL7	A0A494BAC1
RefSeq (mRNA)	NM_001174123	NM_001370919
RefSeq (protein)	NP_001167594	NP_001357848
Location (UCSC)	Chr 18: 74.32 – 74.36 Mb	Chr 18: 84.82 – 84.85 Mb
PubMed search
- Wikidata
View/Edit Human	View/Edit Mouse

Chromosome 18 open reading frame 63 is a protein which in humans is encoded by the C18orf63 gene. This protein is not yet well understood by the scientific community. Research has been conducted suggesting that C18orf63 could be a potential biomarker for early stage pancreatic cancer and breast cancer.

== Gene ==
This gene is located at band 22, sub-band 3, on the long arm of chromosome 18. It is composed of 5065 base pairs spanning from 74,315,875 to 74,359,187 bp on chromosome 18. The gene has a total of 14 exons. C18orf63 is also known by the alias DKFZP78G0119. No isoforms exist for this gene.

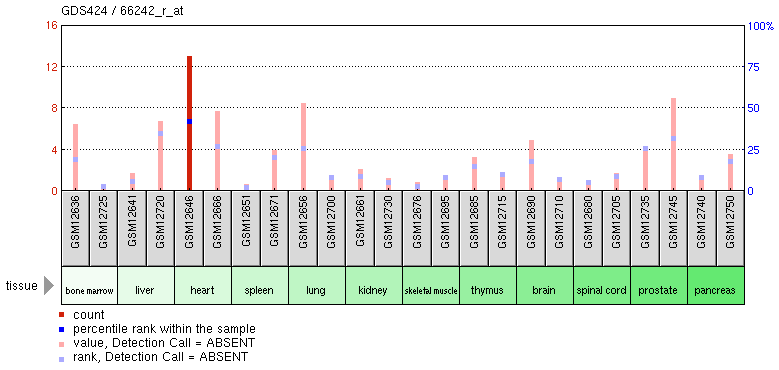
NCBI GEO Expression Profile for C18orf63

=== Expression ===
C18orf63 has high expression in the testis. The gene shows low expression in the kidneys, liver, lung, and pelvis. There is no phenotype associated with this gene.

=== Promoter ===
The promoter region for C18orf63 is 1163 bp long starting at 74,314,813 bp and ending at 74,315,975 bp. The promoter ID is GXP_4417391. The presence of multiple y-box binding transcription factors and SRY transcription factor binding sites suggest that C18orf63 is involved in male sex determination.

== Protein ==
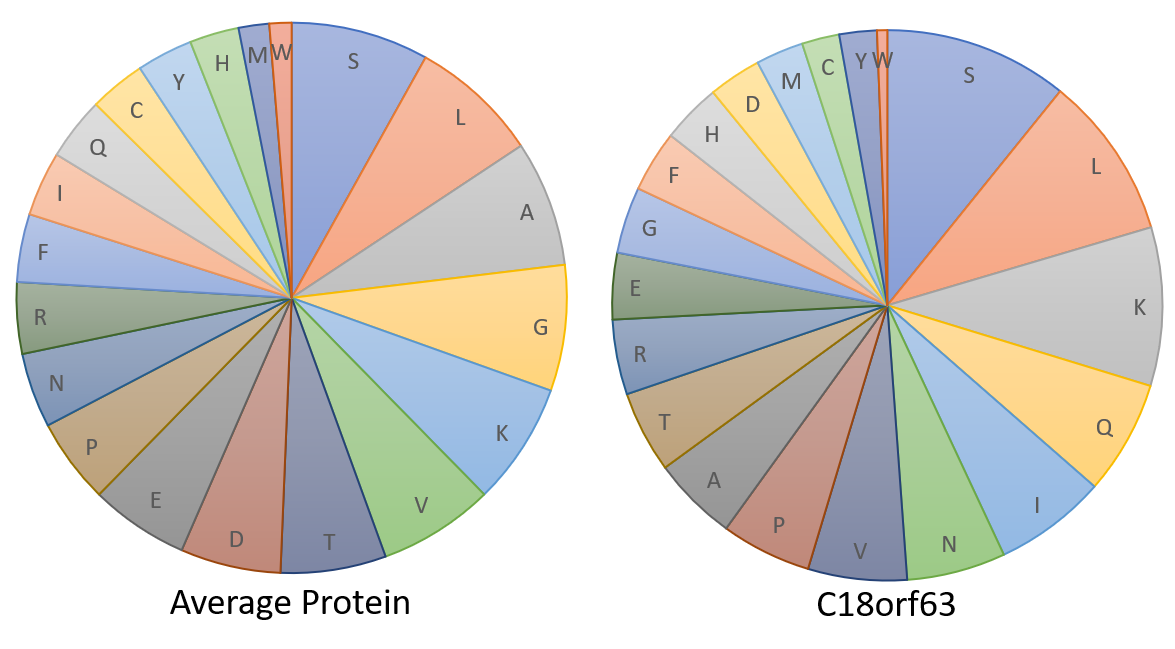
Amino acid composition of the average protein (left) and Amino acid composition of C18orf63 (right)

The C18orf63 protein is composed up of 685 amino acids and has a molecular weight of 77230.50 Da, with a predicted isoelectric point of 9.83. No isoforms exist for this protein. This protein is rich in glutamine, isoleucine, lysine, and serine when compared to the average protein, but lacks in aspartic acid and glycine.

=== Structure ===
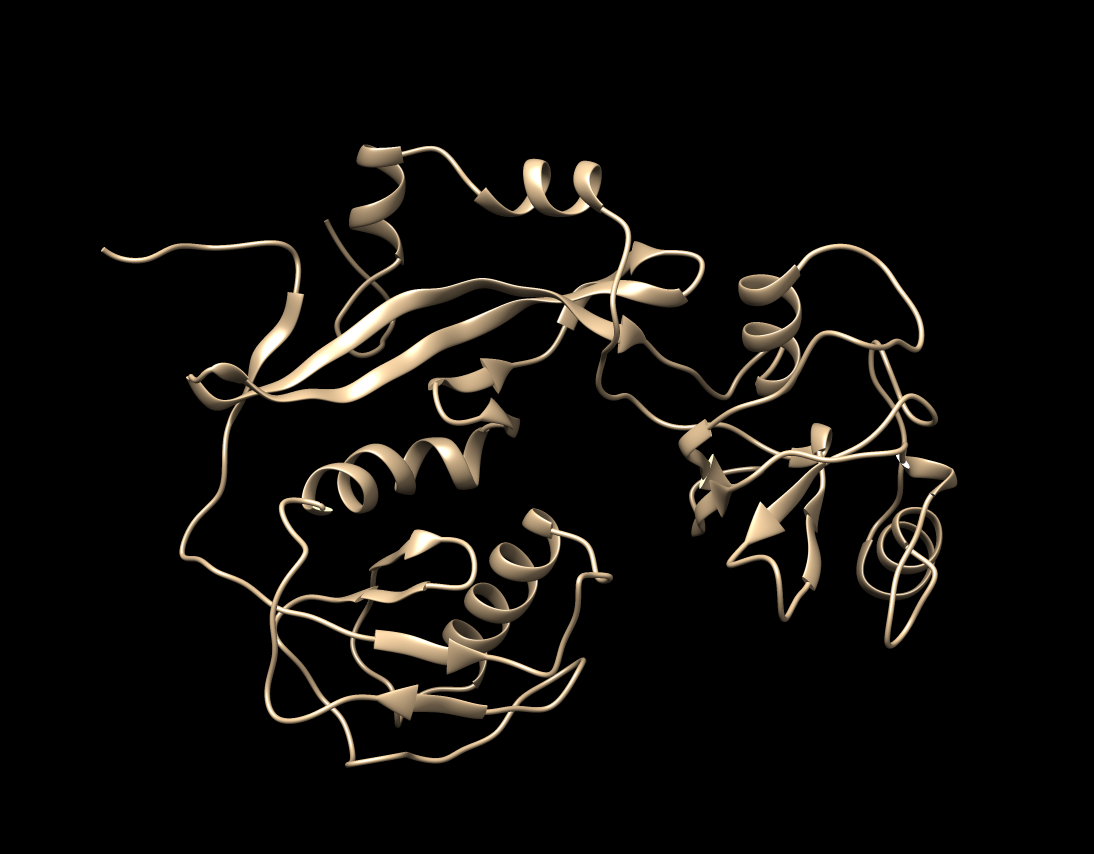
Partial 3D structure for C18orf63

In the predicted secondary structure for this protein there are a number of beta turns, beta strands and alpha helices. For C18orf63 48.6% of the protein is expected to form alpha helices and 28.6% of the structure is expected to be composed of beta strands.

=== Domains and motifs ===
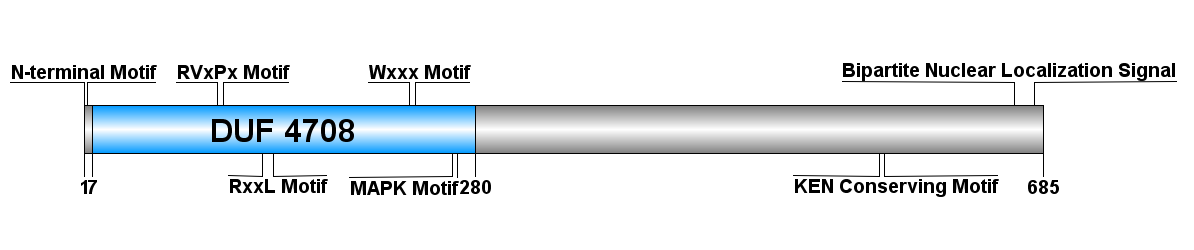
Motifs and Domains for C18orf63

The protein contains one domain of unknown function, DUF 4709, spanning from the 7th amino acid to the 280th amino acid. Motifs that are predicted to exist include an N-terminal motif, RxxL motif, and KEN conserving motif, which all signal for protein degradation. Another motif that is predicted to exist is a Wxxx motif, which facilitates entrance of PTS1 cargo proteins into the organellar lumen, and a RVxPx motif which allows protein transport from the trans-Golgi network to the plasma membrane of the cilia. There is also a bipartite nuclear localization signal at the end of the protein sequence. There is no trans-membrane domain present, indicating that C18orf63 is not a trans-membrane protein.

=== Post-translational modifications ===
Post-translational modifications the protein is predicted to undergo include SUMOylation, PKC and CK2 phosphorylation, N-glycosylation, amiditation, and cleavage. There are six total PKC phosphorylation sites and 2 CK2 phosphorylation sites, 2 SUMOylation sites, and 2 N-glycosylation sites. There are no signal peptides present in this sequence.

=== Subcellular location ===
Due to the nuclear localization signal at the end of the protein sequence, C18orf63 is predicted to be nuclear. C18orf63 has also been predicted to be targeted to the mitochondria in addition to the nucleus.

== Homology ==
=== Orthologs ===
Orthologs have been found in most eukaryotes, with the exception of the class Amphibia. No human paralogs exist for C18orf63. The most distant homolog detectable is Mizuhopecten yessoensis, sharing a 37% identity with the human protein sequence. The domain of unknown function was the only homologous domain present in the protein sequence, it was found to be highly conserved in all orthologs. The table below shows some examples of various orthologs for this protein.

Table of Orthologs for C18orf63
	Genus	Species	Common Name	Accession Number	Sequence Length	Sequence Identity	Sequence Similarity
Mammalia	Galeopterus	variegatus	Flying lemur	XP_008582575.1	677	78%	87%
	Fukomys	damarensis	Damara mole-rat	XP_019061329.1	654	70%	81%
	Equus	przewalskii	Przewalski's horse	XP_008534756.1	751	76%	83%
	Loxodonta	africana	African bush elephant	XP_023399495.1	676	73%	83%
	Chinchilla	lanigera	Long-tailed chinchilla	XP_005373135.1	679	74%	83%
Aves	Corvus	cornix	Hooded crow	XP_019138065.2	743	52%	69%
	Sturnus	vulgaris	Common starling	XP_014726419.1	742	51%	68%
	Struthio	camelus	Southern ostrich	XP_009668441.1	741	44%	62%
	Phaethon	lepturus	White-tailed tropicbird	XP_010287785.1	740	44%	60%
	Nestor	notabillis	Kea	XP_010018784.1	741	43%	60%
Reptillia	Ophiophagus	hannah	King cobra	ETE73844.1	671	55%	69%
	Anolis	carolinensis	Carolina anole	XP_008106943.1	719	48%	66%
	Pogona	vitticeps	Central bearded dragon	XP_020657479.1	676	52%	70%
	Chrysemys	picta	Painted turtle	XP_008162704.1	770	45%	60%
Fish	Callorhinchus	milii	Australian ghostshark	XP_007901438.1	738	57%	74%
	Rhincodon	typus	Whale shark	XP_020370482.1	712	41%	55%
	Salmo	salar	Atlantic salmon	XP_0140366110.1	626	43%	60%
Invertebrates	Stylophora	pistillata	Coral	XP_022802513.1	721	33%	57%
	Acanthaster	planci	Crown of thorns starfish	XP_022082271.1	750	37%	56%
	Mizuhopecten	yessoensis	Scallop	OWF48219.1	260	37%	57%

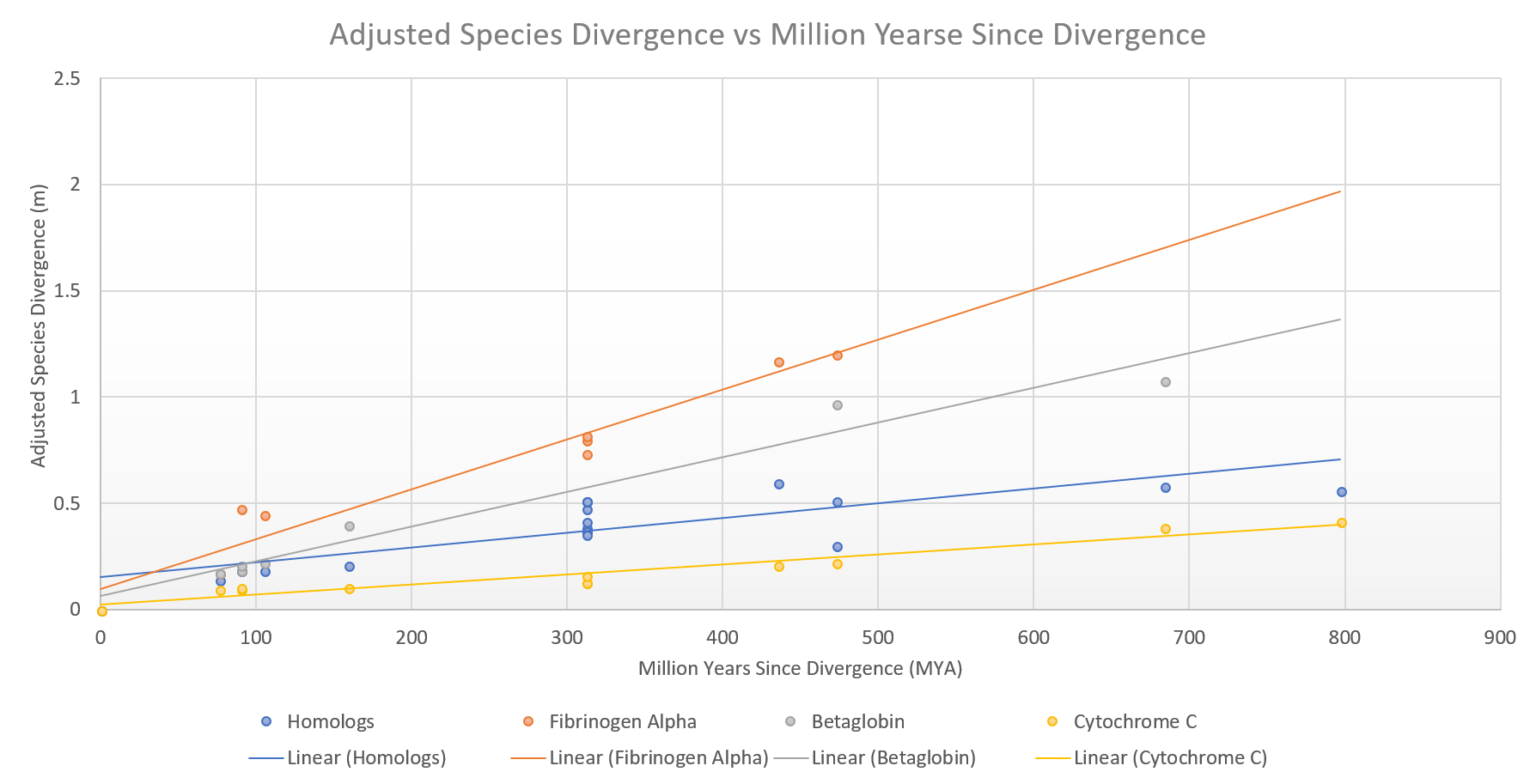
Rate of evolution for C18orf63 when compared to betaglobin, fibrinogen alpha, and cytochrome c

=== Rate of evolution ===
C18orf63 is a mildly slow evolving protein. The protein evolves faster than Cytochorme C but slower than Betaglobin.

== Interacting proteins ==
Transcription factors of interest predicted to bind to the regulatory sequence include p53 tumor suppressors, SRY testis determining factors, Y-box binding transcription factors, and glucocorticoid responsive elements. The JUN protein was found to interact with C18orf63 through anti-bait co-immunoprecipitation. The JUN protein binds to the USP28 promoter in colorectal cancer cells and is involved in the activation of these cancer cells.

== Clinical significance ==
=== Mutations ===
A variety of missense mutations occur in the human population for this protein. In the regulatory sequence missense mutations occur at two transcription factor binding sites. Transcription factors affected are glucocorticoid responsive elements and E2F-myc cell cycle regulars. There are eleven common mutations that occur that affect the protein sequence itself. None of these mutations affect predicted post-translational modifications the protein sequence undergoes.

=== Disease association ===
C18orf63 has been associated with personality disorders, obesity, and type two diabetes through a genome-wide association study. Currently research has not shown if C18orf63 plays a direct role in any of these diseases.
