= ELAC1 =

Protein-coding gene in the species Homo sapiens

Identifiers
- Aliases: ELAC1, D29, elaC ribonuclease Z 1
- External IDs: OMIM: 608079; MGI: 1890495; GeneCards: ELAC1
Available structures
PDB	Ortholog search: PDBe RCSB
PDB	List of PDB id codes 3ZWF
Enzyme activity
EC #	BRENDA	ExPASy	KEGG	MetaCyc
3.1.26.11	↗	↗	↗	↗

Gene location (Human)
Chr.	Chromosome 18 (human)
Band	18q21.2	Start	50,967,991 bp
Band	18q21.2	End	50,988,121 bp

Gene location (Mouse)
Chr.	Chromosome 18 (mouse)
Band	18|18 E2	Start	73,868,109 bp
Band	18|18 E2	End	73,887,550 bp
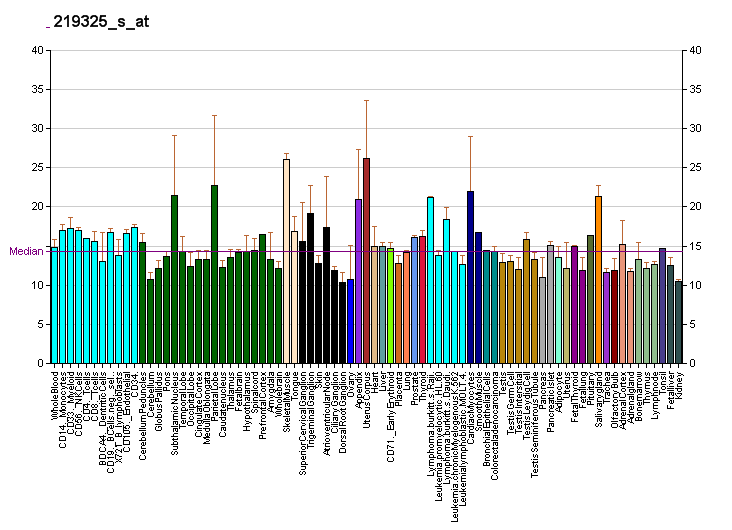
RNA expression pattern
Bgee	Human / Mouse (ortholog); Top expressed in: islet of Langerhans; Achilles tendon; gonad; right adrenal gland; right lobe of thyroid gland; body of pancreas; left adrenal gland; testicle; right adrenal cortex; left adrenal cortex / Top expressed in: retinal pigment epithelium; lacrimal gland; dorsomedial hypothalamic nucleus; paraventricular nucleus of hypothalamus; ciliary body; substantia nigra; central gray substance of midbrain; median eminence; arcuate nucleus; lumbar subsegment of spinal cord; More reference expression data
BioGPS	More reference expression data
Gene ontology
Molecular function	nuclease activity; endonuclease activity; 3'-tRNA processing endoribonuclease activity; hydrolase activity; metal ion binding; endoribonuclease activity, producing 5'-phosphomonoesters
Cellular component	cytoplasm; cytosol; nucleus
Biological process	tRNA 3'-trailer cleavage; RNA phosphodiester bond hydrolysis, endonucleolytic; tRNA processing; tRNA 3'-trailer cleavage, endonucleolytic
Sources:Amigo / QuickGO
Orthologs
Databases	NCBI: entry; OMA: entry
Species	Human	Mouse
Entrez	55520	114615
Ensembl	ENSG00000141642	ENSMUSG00000036941
UniProt	Q9H777	Q8VEB6
RefSeq (mRNA)	NM_018696	NM_053255
RefSeq (protein)	NP_061166	NP_444485
Location (UCSC)	Chr 18: 50.97 – 50.99 Mb	Chr 18: 73.87 – 73.89 Mb
PubMed search
- Wikidata
View/Edit Human	View/Edit Mouse

Zinc phosphodiesterase ELAC protein 1 is an enzyme that in humans is encoded by the ELAC1 gene.

== Function ==
The enzyme is a phosphodiesterase.
