= ZBTB14 =

Protein-coding gene in the species Homo sapiens

Identifiers
- Aliases: ZBTB14, ZF5, ZFP-161, ZFP-5, ZFP161, ZNF478, zinc finger and BTB domain containing 14
- External IDs: OMIM: 602126; MGI: 1195345; GeneCards: ZBTB14

Gene location (Human)
Chr.	Chromosome 18 (human)
Band	18p11.31	Start	5,289,019 bp
Band	18p11.31	End	5,297,053 bp

Gene location (Mouse)
Chr.	Chromosome 17 (mouse)
Band	17 E1.3|17 40.42 cM	Start	69,690,045 bp
Band	17 E1.3|17 40.42 cM	End	69,698,194 bp
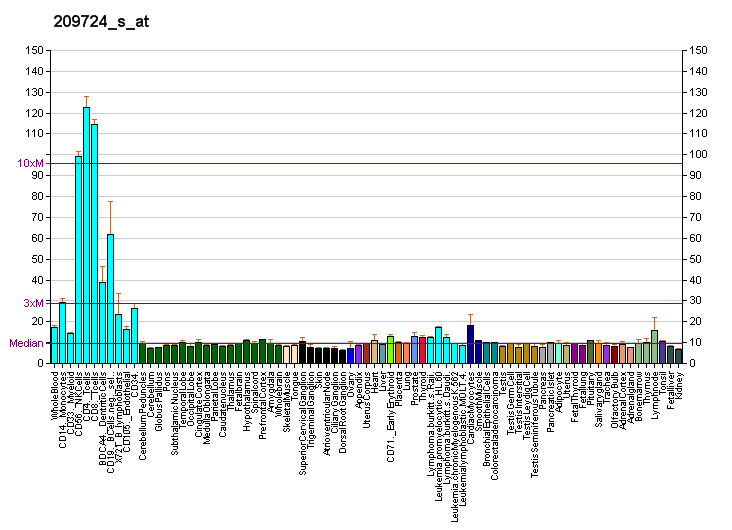

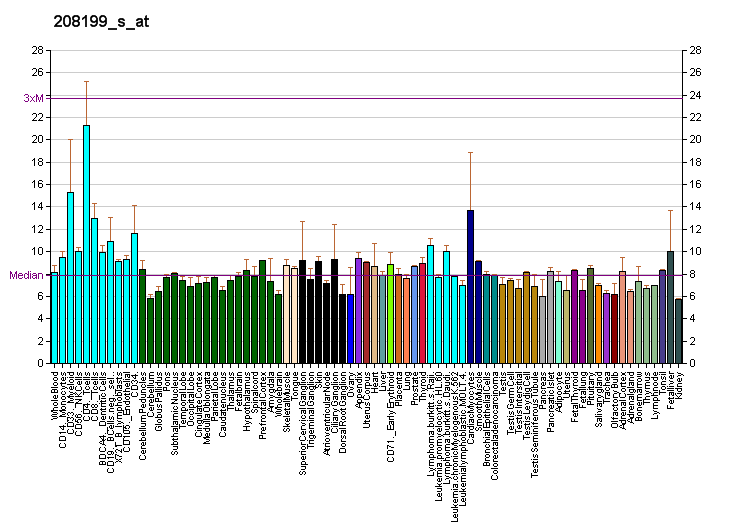
RNA expression pattern
Bgee	Human / Mouse (ortholog); Top expressed in: Achilles tendon; lymph node; monocyte; granulocyte; ganglionic eminence; gallbladder; ventricular zone; C1 segment; gonad; rectum / Top expressed in: ureter; condyle; Paneth cell; ciliary body; fossa; medullary collecting duct; lacrimal gland; ascending aorta; cumulus cell; aortic valve; More reference expression data
BioGPS	More reference expression data
Gene ontology
Molecular function	DNA-binding transcription factor activity; sequence-specific DNA binding; DNA binding; protein binding; metal ion binding; nucleic acid binding; RNA polymerase II cis-regulatory region sequence-specific DNA binding; DNA-binding transcription repressor activity, RNA polymerase II-specific; DNA-binding transcription factor activity, RNA polymerase II-specific
Cellular component	nucleus; nucleoplasm; nucleolus; cytosol; aggresome
Biological process	cardiac septum development; heart valve development; negative regulation of transcription, DNA-templated; regulation of transcription, DNA-templated; coronary vasculature development; transcription, DNA-templated; negative regulation of transcription by RNA polymerase II
Sources:Amigo / QuickGO
Orthologs
Databases	NCBI: entry; OMA: entry
Species	Human	Mouse
Entrez	7541	22666
Ensembl	ENSG00000198081	ENSMUSG00000049672
UniProt	O43829	Q08376
RefSeq (mRNA)	NM_003409; NM_001143823; NM_001243702; NM_001243704	NM_009547; NM_001356282; NM_001356283
RefSeq (protein)	NP_001137295; NP_001230631; NP_001230633; NP_003400	NP_033573; NP_001343211; NP_001343212
Location (UCSC)	Chr 18: 5.29 – 5.3 Mb	Chr 17: 69.69 – 69.7 Mb
PubMed search
- Wikidata
View/Edit Human	View/Edit Mouse

Zinc finger and BTB domain-containing protein 14 is a protein that in humans is encoded by the ZBTB14 gene (previously ZFP161). The ZBTB14 protein acts as a transcription activator for the dopamine transporter, while instead acting as a transcription repressor for FMR1, MYC, and thymidine kinases.

== See also ==
- Chromosome 18 (human)
- Sequence homology
- Zinc finger
- BTB/POZ domain
