= ESCO1 =

Protein-coding gene in the species Homo sapiens

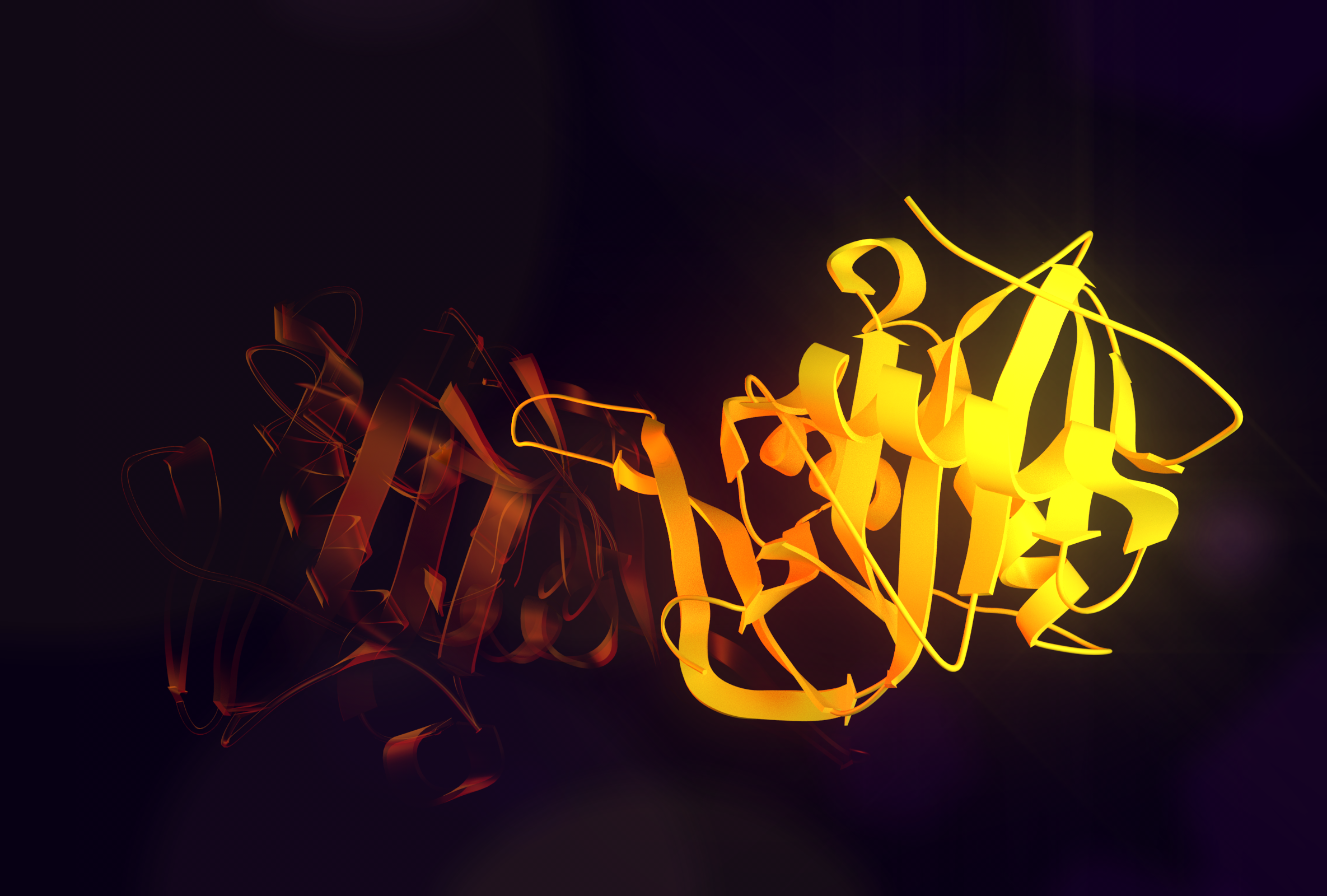

Identifiers
- Aliases: ESCO1, A930014I12Rik, CTF, ECO1, EFO1, ESO1, establishment of sister chromatid cohesion N-acetyltransferase 1
- External IDs: OMIM: 609674; MGI: 1925055; GeneCards: ESCO1
Available structures
PDB	Ortholog search: PDBe RCSB
PDB	List of PDB id codes 4MXE

Gene location (Human)
Chr.	Chromosome 18 (human)
Band	18q11.2	Start	21,529,284 bp
Band	18q11.2	End	21,600,884 bp

Gene location (Mouse)
Chr.	Chromosome 18 (mouse)
Band	18|18 A1	Start	10,566,507 bp
Band	18|18 A1	End	10,610,352 bp
RNA expression pattern
Bgee	Human / Mouse (ortholog); Top expressed in: buccal mucosa cell; tendon of biceps brachii; pancreatic epithelial cell; tibialis anterior muscle; secondary oocyte; Achilles tendon; deltoid muscle; testicle; gonad; epithelium of nasopharynx / Top expressed in: saccule; zygote; primary oocyte; secondary oocyte; otic placode; otic vesicle; mesenteric lymph nodes; lacrimal gland; cumulus cell; olfactory epithelium; More reference expression data
BioGPS	n/a
Gene ontology
Molecular function	transferase activity; acyltransferase activity; metal ion binding; N-acetyltransferase activity; zinc ion binding; peptide-lysine-N-acetyltransferase activity; identical protein binding; acetyltransferase activity
Cellular component	chromatin; nucleus; nucleoplasm; chromosome
Biological process	post-translational protein acetylation; cell cycle; sister chromatid cohesion; regulation of DNA replication; peptidyl-lysine acetylation
Sources:Amigo / QuickGO
Orthologs
Databases	NCBI: entry; OMA: entry
Species	Human	Mouse
Entrez	114799	77805
Ensembl	ENSG00000141446	ENSMUSG00000024293
UniProt	Q5FWF5	Q69Z69
RefSeq (mRNA)	NM_052911	NM_001081222; NM_144542
RefSeq (protein)	NP_443143	NP_001074691
Location (UCSC)	Chr 18: 21.53 – 21.6 Mb	Chr 18: 10.57 – 10.61 Mb
PubMed search
- Wikidata
View/Edit Human	View/Edit Mouse

Establishment of sister chromatid cohesion N-acetyltransferase 1 is a protein that in humans is encoded by the ESCO1 gene.

== Function ==
ESCO1 belongs to a conserved family of acetyltransferases involved in sister chromatid cohesion.

== See also ==
- Lysine N-acetyltransferase
