= ZCCHC2 =

Protein-coding gene in the species Homo sapiens

Identifiers
- Aliases: ZCCHC2, C18orf49, zinc finger CCHC-type containing 2
- External IDs: MGI: 2444114; GeneCards: ZCCHC2

Gene location (Human)
Chr.	Chromosome 18 (human)
Band	18q21.33	Start	62,523,025 bp
Band	18q21.33	End	62,587,709 bp

Gene location (Mouse)
Chr.	Chromosome 1 (mouse)
Band	1|1 E2.1	Start	105,918,136 bp
Band	1|1 E2.1	End	105,961,804 bp
RNA expression pattern
Bgee	Human / Mouse (ortholog); Top expressed in: secondary oocyte; testicle; tail of epididymis; gastrocnemius muscle; visceral pleura; right lobe of liver; caput epididymis; popliteal artery; tibial arteries; corpus epididymis / Top expressed in: secondary oocyte; zygote; primary oocyte; otolith organ; spermatocyte; utricle; granulocyte; seminiferous tubule; decidua; spermatid; More reference expression data
BioGPS	n/a
Orthologs
Databases	NCBI: entry; OMA: entry
Species	Human	Mouse
Entrez	54877	227449
Ensembl	ENSG00000141664	ENSMUSG00000038866
UniProt	Q9C0B9	Q69ZB8
RefSeq (mRNA)	NM_017742	NM_001122675; NM_001122676
RefSeq (protein)	NP_060212	NP_001116147; NP_001116148
Location (UCSC)	Chr 18: 62.52 – 62.59 Mb	Chr 1: 105.92 – 105.96 Mb
PubMed search
- Wikidata
View/Edit Human	View/Edit Mouse

Zinc finger CCHC domain-containing protein 2 is a protein that in humans is encoded by the ZCCHC2 gene.
