= TWSG1 =

Protein-coding gene in the species Homo sapiens

Identifiers
- Aliases: TWSG1, TSG, twisted gastrulation BMP signaling modulator 1
- External IDs: OMIM: 605049; MGI: 2137520; GeneCards: TWSG1

Gene location (Human)
Chr.	Chromosome 18 (human)
Band	18p11.22	Start	9,334,767 bp
Band	18p11.22	End	9,402,420 bp

Gene location (Mouse)
Chr.	Chromosome 17 (mouse)
Band	17 E1.1|17 35.26 cM	Start	66,228,967 bp
Band	17 E1.1|17 35.26 cM	End	66,258,221 bp
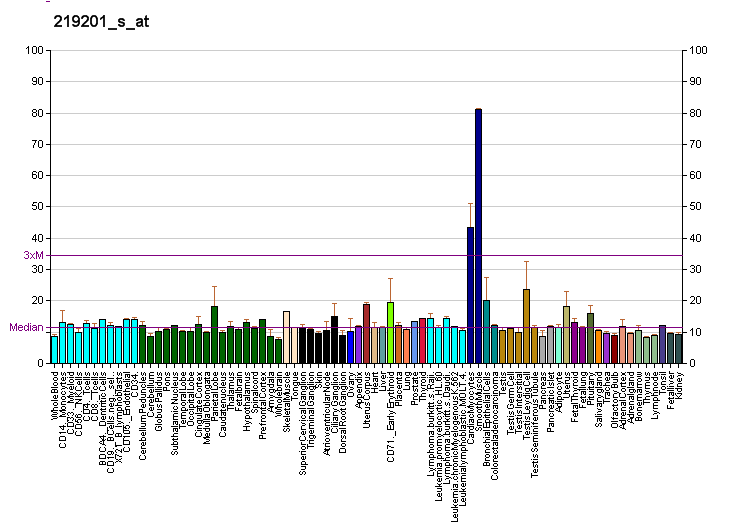
RNA expression pattern
Bgee	Human / Mouse (ortholog); Top expressed in: seminal vesicula; cartilage tissue; germinal epithelium; caput epididymis; corpus epididymis; tibia; tail of epididymis; visceral pleura; parietal pleura; Descending thoracic aorta / Top expressed in: cumulus cell; tail of embryo; ascending aorta; aortic valve; medullary collecting duct; genital tubercle; corneal stroma; efferent ductule; right ventricle; molar; More reference expression data
BioGPS	More reference expression data
Gene ontology
Molecular function	protein binding; transforming growth factor beta binding
Cellular component	extracellular region; extracellular space
Biological process	negative regulation of BMP signaling pathway; multicellular organism development; mesoderm formation; cell differentiation; forebrain development; camera-type eye development; salivary gland morphogenesis; BMP signaling pathway; ossification; negative regulation of osteoblast differentiation; tissue development; positive regulation of BMP signaling pathway; negative regulation of cytokine production; transforming growth factor beta receptor signaling pathway; positive regulation of pathway-restricted SMAD protein phosphorylation; negative regulation of CD4-positive, alpha-beta T cell activation; negative regulation of CD4-positive, alpha-beta T cell proliferation; hemopoiesis
Sources:Amigo / QuickGO
Orthologs
Databases	NCBI: entry; OMA: entry
Species	Human	Mouse
Entrez	57045	65960
Ensembl	ENSG00000128791	ENSMUSG00000024098
UniProt	Q9GZX9	Q9EP52
RefSeq (mRNA)	NM_020648	NM_023053
RefSeq (protein)	NP_065699	NP_075540
Location (UCSC)	Chr 18: 9.33 – 9.4 Mb	Chr 17: 66.23 – 66.26 Mb
PubMed search
- Wikidata
View/Edit Human	View/Edit Mouse

Twisted gastrulation protein homolog 1 is a protein that in humans is encoded by the TWSG1 gene. The protein is a binding protein for bone morphogenetic proteins, similar to Chordin. The Twisted gastrulation gene is expressed in the extraembryonic tissues during organogenesis, and in certain adult tissues such as the lymph nodes, kidneys, liver, and lungs.
