= SLC35D4 =

Protein-coding gene in the species Homo sapiens

Identifiers
- Aliases: SLC35D4, C18orf45, hVVT, transmembrane protein 241, TMEM241, Solute carrier family 35 member D4
- External IDs: OMIM: 615430; MGI: 2442435; GeneCards: SLC35D4

Gene location (Human)
| Chr. | Chromosome 18 (human) |
| Band | 18q11.2 | Start | 23,197,144 bp |
| Band | 18q11.2 | End | 23,437,961 bp |

Gene location (Mouse)
| Chr. | Chromosome 18 (mouse) |
| Band | 18|18 A1 | Start | 12,097,507 bp |
| Band | 18|18 A1 | End | 12,254,594 bp |
RNA expression pattern
| Bgee | Human / Mouse (ortholog); Top expressed in: buccal mucosa cell; pancreatic ductal cell; tendon of biceps brachii; nasal epithelium; skin of arm; internal globus pallidus; tibialis anterior muscle; cardiac muscle tissue of right atrium; mucosa of ileum; myocardium of left ventricle / Top expressed in: zygote; granulocyte; lumbar subsegment of spinal cord; secondary oocyte; right kidney; neural tube; yolk sac; embryo; embryo; neural layer of retina; More reference expression data |
| BioGPS | n/a |
Gene ontology
| Molecular function | nucleotide-sugar transmembrane transporter activity; GDP-fucose transmembrane transporter activity |
| Cellular component | membrane; integral component of membrane |
| Biological process | GDP-mannose transmembrane transport; GDP-fucose import into Golgi lumen |
Sources:Amigo / QuickGO
Orthologs
| Databases | NCBI: entry; OMA: entry |
| Species | Human | Mouse |
| Entrez | 85019 | 338363 |
| Ensembl | ENSG00000134490 | ENSMUSG00000049411 |
| UniProt | Q24JQ0 | Q3UME2 |
| RefSeq (mRNA) | NM_032933; NM_001318834 | NM_001289666; NM_001289667; NM_178801 |
| RefSeq (protein) | NP_001305763; NP_116322 | NP_001276595; NP_001276596; NP_848916 |
| Location (UCSC) | Chr 18: 23.2 – 23.44 Mb | Chr 18: 12.1 – 12.25 Mb |
| PubMed search |
- Wikidata
| View/Edit Human | View/Edit Mouse |

UDP-N-acetylglucosamine transporter SLC35D4 is a protein which in humans is encoded by the SLC35D4 gene (previously TMEM241). SLC35D4 functions to transport UDP-N-acetylglucosamine into the Golgi apparatus. It contributes to the breakdown of NPC2 in the lysosomes.

== Gene ==
In humans, TMEM241 is a 142,188 bp gene located at 18q11.2 which contains 24 exons.

=== Gene neighborhood ===
TMEM241 is located near CABLES1, RIOK3, and NPC1 on chromosome 18.

== mRNA ==
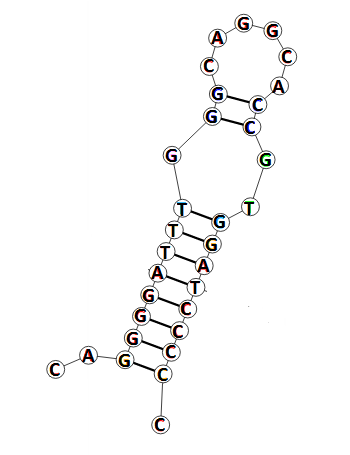
TMEM241 Isoform 1 5' UTR (untranslated region) hairpin

The primary mRNA for human TMEM241, isoform 1, contains a 5' UTR hairpin loop conserved in primates. The primary mRNA for human TMEM241 isoform 1 contains binding sites in its 3' UTR for the miRNAs 520f-5p, 378a-5p, and 6866-5p.

== Protein ==
=== General properties ===
There are over 10 transcript variants predicted for the human TMEM241 gene found on BLAST. TMEM241 Isoform 1 is approximately 31 kDa in mass. The protein has an isoelectric point of 8.7. and is particularly rich in the amino acid phenylalanine, containing twice the normal proportion of this amino acid.

=== Conserved domains ===
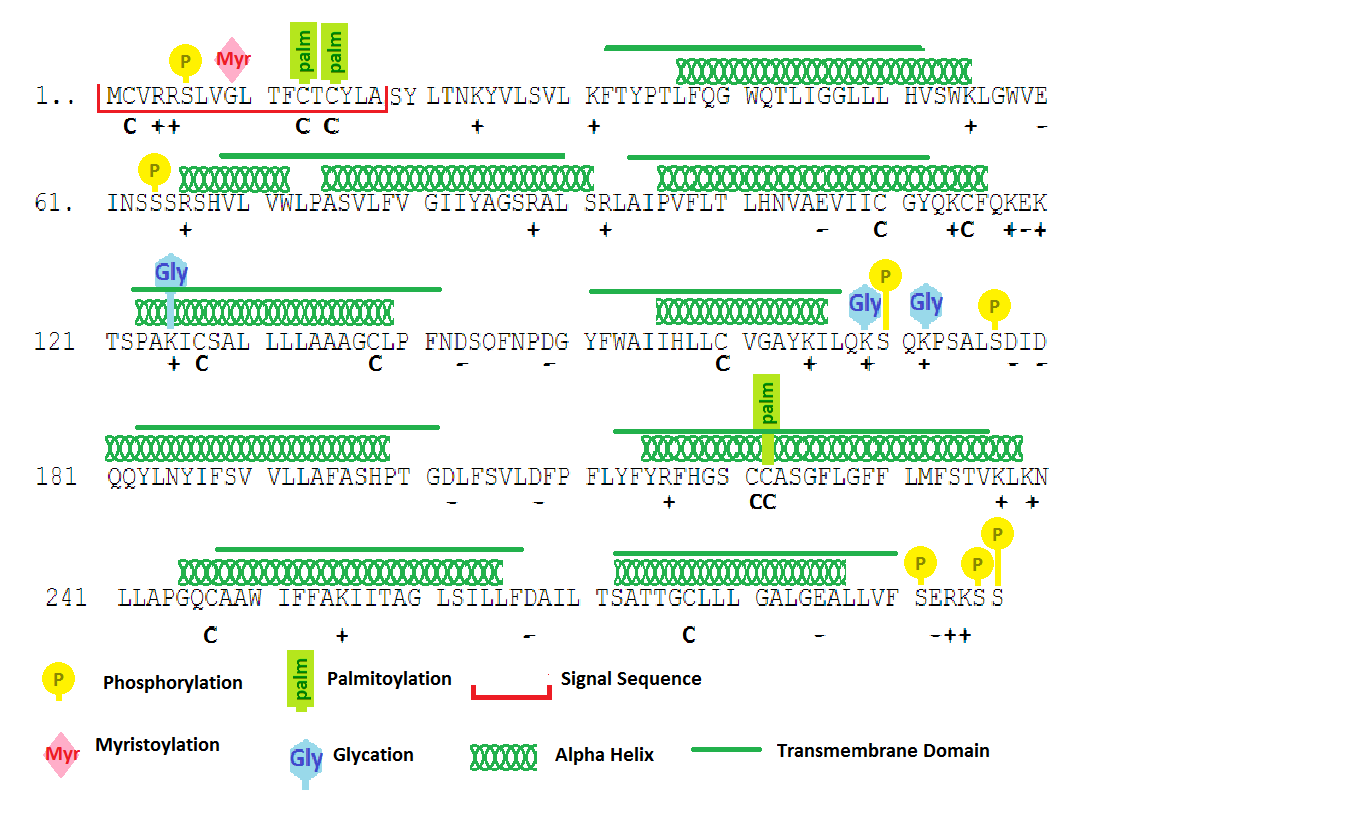
Structural Details of TMEM241 Isoform 1

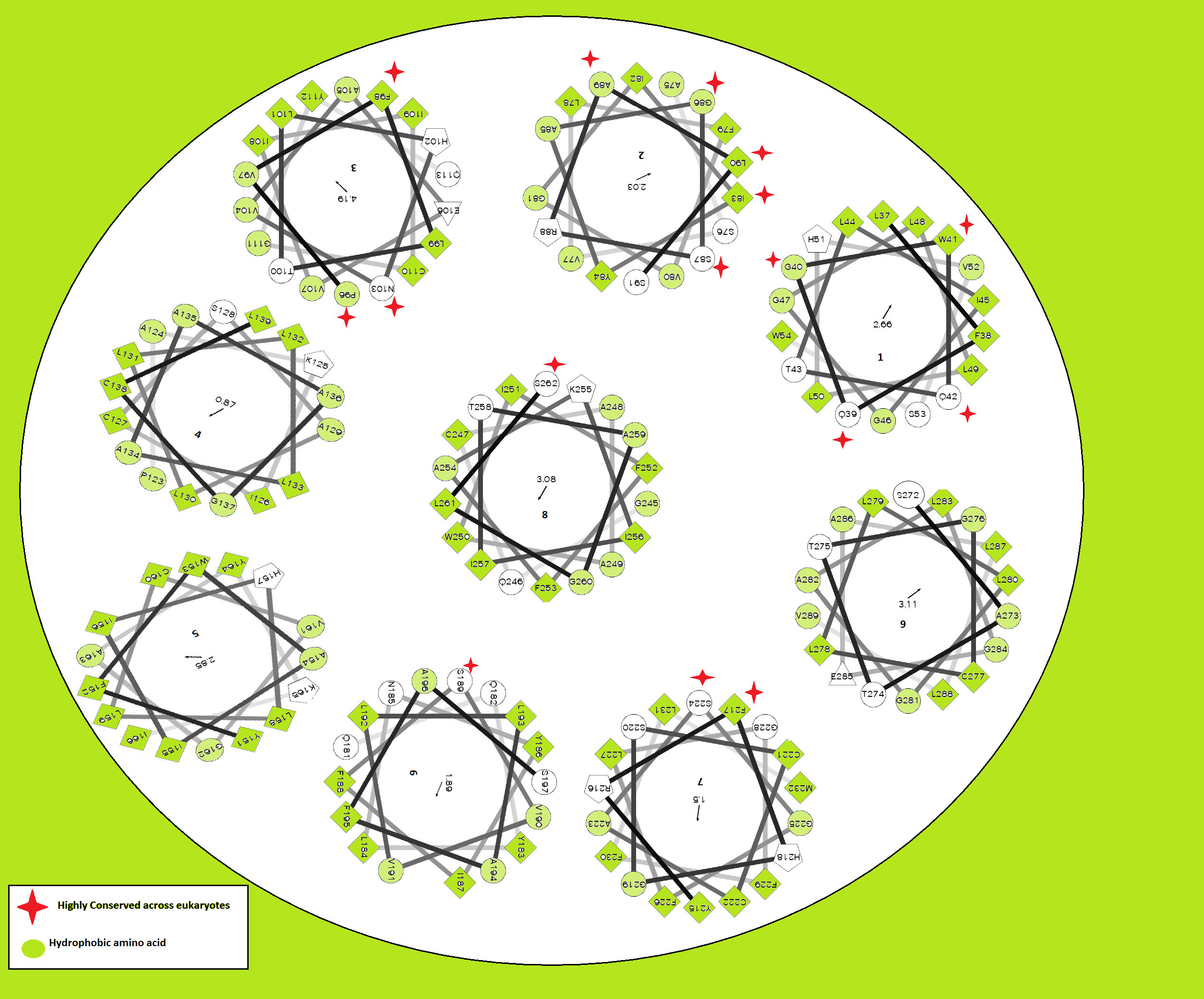
Alpha helix wheel diagram of TMEM241 isoform 1 showing hydrophobic and hydrophilic region interactions with lipid membrane.

TMEM241 is composed of 9 transmembrane domains forming a hydrophobic integral component of the membrane composed primarily of alpha helices. TMEM241 contains a VRG4 (Vanadate Resistant Glycosylation) domain with homology to the sugar transporter domain VRG4 from Saccharomyces cerevisiae (yeast).

=== Post-translational modification ===
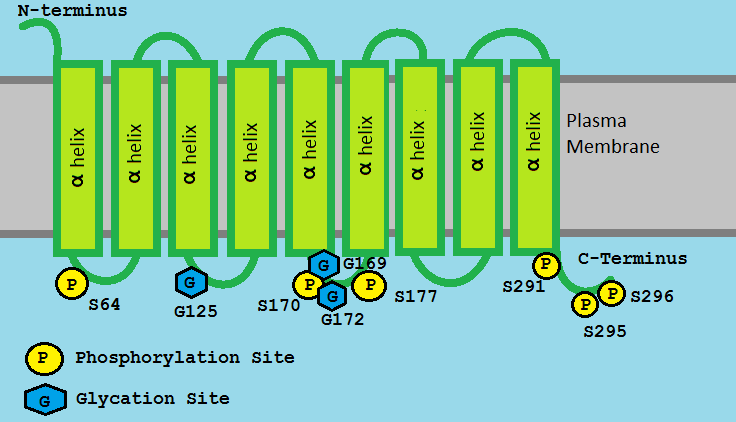
TMEM241 Isoform 1 Post translational modification sites

TMEM241 is predicted to undergo various phosphorylations, glycation, palmitoylation. For example, TMEM241 isoform 1 has a phosphorylation sites on S6, 64, 170, 177, 291, 295 and 296; glycation sites on K125, 169 and 172; palmitoylation sites on C13, 15, 221.

=== Interacting proteins ===
There is some evidence that this protein may interact with keratin filament based on a two hybrid screen with the keratin protein KRT40.

== Expression ==
TMEM241 is likely to be expressed in all tissues at varying levels from basal to moderate expression. Some studies have found changes in the expression of TMEM241. For instance, in cases of acute megakaryoblastic leukemia, TMEM241 was found to be one of the most upregulated genes. In another case TMEM241 was found to be upregulated during the unfolded protein response following the overexpression of Ero1α (Endoplasmic Reticulum oxidoreduclin 1α).

== Homology ==
TMEM241 is conserved throughout eukaryotes.

=== Orthologs ===
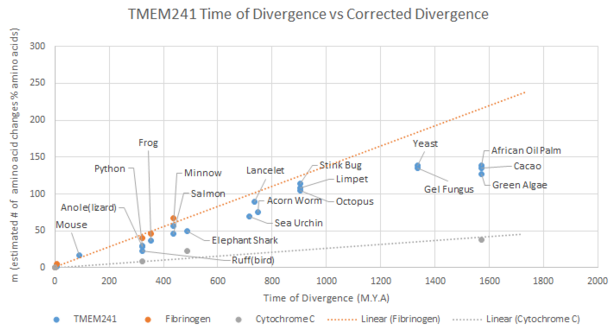
Divergence Rate of TMEM241

TMEM241 is conserved across all animals and homologs are found throughout eukaryotes. TMEM241 has 19% global identity and 60% identity to GDP-mannose transporter from S. cerevisiae, which contains the VRG4 domain. It is likely that TMEM241 is a GDP-mannose transporter due to this similarity. The graph on the right shows the relative level of conservation of TMEM241 across many species of organism using the principle of a Molecular Clock.

| Scientific name | Common name | Divergence from H. sapiens (m.y.a) | Protein Length (amino acids) | % Identity to H. sapiens | Accession number |
|---|---|---|---|---|---|
| Homo sapiens | Human | 0 | 296 | 100 | NP_116322 |
| Mus musculus | Mouse | 90.1 | 297 | 84 | NP_001276595 |
| Calidris pugnax | Ruff (bird) | 320.5 | 296 | 80 | XP_003219697 |
| Python bivittatus | Python | 320.5 | 296 | 74 | XP_014793906 |
| Xenopus laevis | Frog | 354.4 | 293 | 69 | NP_001091222 |
| Salmo salar | Salmon | 436.8 | 296 | 63 | XP_014036453 |
| Octopus bimaculoides | Octopus | 903 | 291 | 35 | XP_014776992 |
| Halyomorpha halys | Stink bug | 903 | 257 | 32 | XP_014284006 |
| Saccharomyces cerevisiae | Yeast | 1335.5 | 216 | 25 | AJS02580 |
| Coccomyxa subellipsoidea | Green Algae | 1570.5 | 296 | 28 | XP_005651133 |

=== Paralogs ===
TMEM241 has two paralogs in humans which have homologs throughout eukaryotes, UGTREL8 and UGTREL7. TMEM241, UGTREL8 and UGTREL7 are a family of sugar transport proteins with close identity to the GDP-mannose transporter identified in S. cerevisiae.

| % Identity | TMEM241 (H.sapiens) | UGTREL7 (H.sapiens) | UGTREL8 (H.sapiens) | GDP Mannose Transporter (S. cerevisiae) |
|---|---|---|---|---|
| TMEM241 (H. sapiens) | 100% | 19.9% | 23.9% | 19.0% |
| UGTREL7 (H. sapiens) | 19.9% | 100% | 52.2% | 18.8% |
| UGTREL8 (H. sapiens) | 23.9% | 52.2% | 100% | 19.9% |
| GDP Mannose Transporter (S. cerivisiae) | 19.0% | 18.8% | 19.9% | 100% |
