= HDHD2 =

Protein-coding gene in the species Homo sapiens

Available structures
PDB	Ortholog search: PDBe RCSB
PDB	List of PDB id codes 3HLT

Identifiers
- Aliases: HDHD2, 3110052N05Rik, HEL-S-301, haloacid dehalogenase like hydrolase domain containing 2
- External IDs: MGI: 1924237; HomoloGene: 12667; GeneCards: HDHD2; OMA:HDHD2 - orthologs

Gene location (Human)
Chr.	Chromosome 18 (human)
Band	18q21.1	Start	47,107,408 bp
Band	18q21.1	End	47,150,500 bp

Gene location (Mouse)
Chr.	Chromosome 18 (mouse)
Band	18|18 E3	Start	77,031,788 bp
Band	18|18 E3	End	77,063,003 bp
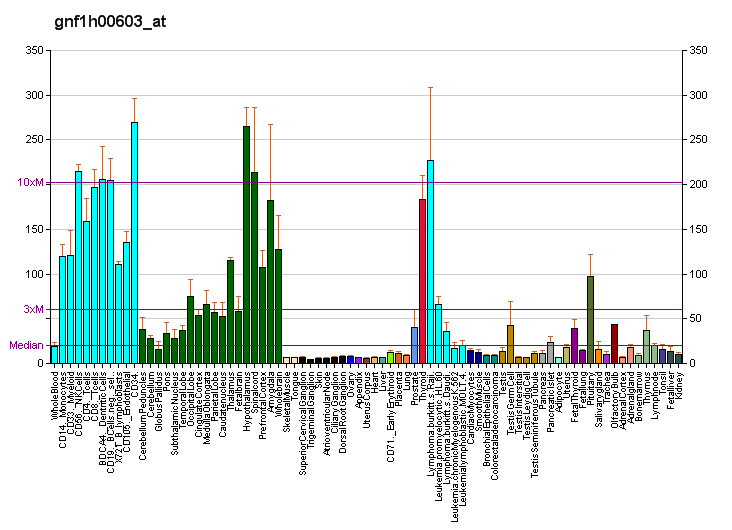
RNA expression pattern
Bgee	Human / Mouse (ortholog); Top expressed in: substantia nigra; C1 segment; prefrontal cortex; hypothalamus; amygdala; superior frontal gyrus; cerebellar cortex; dorsolateral prefrontal cortex; cerebellar hemisphere; Brodmann area 9 / Top expressed in: right kidney; dentate gyrus of hippocampal formation granule cell; superior frontal gyrus; ventricular zone; muscle of thigh; primary visual cortex; neural layer of retina; neural tube; cerebellar cortex; esophagus; More reference expression data
BioGPS	More reference expression data
Gene ontology
Molecular function	metal ion binding; enzyme binding; phosphatase activity; protein binding
Cellular component	extracellular exosome
Biological process	dephosphorylation; biological process
Sources:Amigo / QuickGO
Orthologs
Species	Human	Mouse
Entrez	84064	76987
Ensembl	ENSG00000167220	ENSMUSG00000025421
UniProt	Q9H0R4	Q3UGR5
RefSeq (mRNA)	NM_032124; NM_001318765	NM_001039201; NM_001039202; NM_029826; NM_001361227
RefSeq (protein)	NP_001305694; NP_115500	NP_001034290; NP_001034291; NP_084102; NP_001348156
Location (UCSC)	Chr 18: 47.11 – 47.15 Mb	Chr 18: 77.03 – 77.06 Mb
PubMed search
- Wikidata
View/Edit Human	View/Edit Mouse

Haloacid dehalogenase-like hydrolase domain-containing protein 2 is an enzyme that in humans is encoded by the HDHD2 gene.

== See also ==
- Dehalogenase
- Hydrolase
