= IER3IP1 =

Protein-coding gene in the species Homo sapiens

Identifiers
- Aliases: IER3IP1, MEDS, PRO2309, HSPC039, immediate early response 3 interacting protein 1
- External IDs: OMIM: 609382; MGI: 1913441; HomoloGene: 41106; GeneCards: IER3IP1; OMA:IER3IP1 - orthologs

Gene location (Human)
Chr.	Chromosome 18 (human)
Band	18q21.1	Start	47,152,834 bp
Band	18q21.1	End	47,176,364 bp

Gene location (Mouse)
Chr.	Chromosome 18 (mouse)
Band	18|18 E3	Start	77,017,713 bp
Band	18|18 E3	End	77,029,308 bp
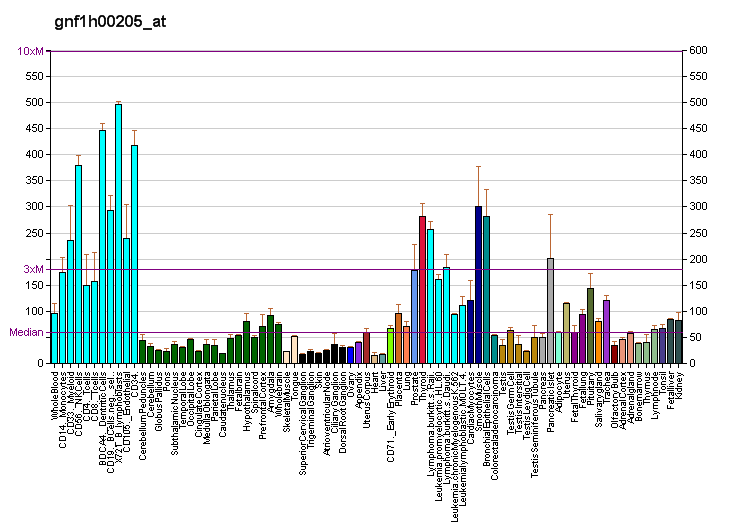
RNA expression pattern
Bgee	Human / Mouse (ortholog); Top expressed in: oocyte; secondary oocyte; palpebral conjunctiva; tibia; deltoid muscle; myocardium of left ventricle; pancreatic epithelial cell; tibialis anterior muscle; quadriceps femoris muscle; vastus lateralis muscle / Top expressed in: yolk sac; cumulus cell; embryo; muscle of thigh; blastocyst; embryo; median eminence; seminal vesicula; superior cervical ganglion; right kidney; More reference expression data
BioGPS	More reference expression data
Orthologs
Species	Human	Mouse
Entrez	51124	66191
Ensembl	ENSG00000134049	ENSMUSG00000090000
UniProt	Q9Y5U9	Q9CR20
RefSeq (mRNA)	NM_016097	NM_025409
RefSeq (protein)	NP_057181	NP_079685
Location (UCSC)	Chr 18: 47.15 – 47.18 Mb	Chr 18: 77.02 – 77.03 Mb
PubMed search
- Wikidata
View/Edit Human	View/Edit Mouse

Immediate early response 3-interacting protein 1 is a protein that in humans is encoded by the IER3IP1 gene.

== See also ==
- Immediate early response 3 (IER3)
