= Zinc finger protein 521 =

Protein found in humans

ZNF521

Identifiers
- Aliases: ZNF521, EHZF, Evi3, zinc finger protein 521
- External IDs: OMIM: 610974; MGI: 95459; GeneCards: ZNF521

Gene location (Human)
Chr.	Chromosome 18 (human)
Band	18q11.2	Start	25,061,924 bp
Band	18q11.2	End	25,352,190 bp

Gene location (Mouse)
Chr.	Chromosome 18 (mouse)
Band	18 A1|18 7.68 cM	Start	13,820,070 bp
Band	18 A1|18 7.68 cM	End	14,105,844 bp
RNA expression pattern
Bgee	Human / Mouse (ortholog); Top expressed in: cerebellar vermis; buccal mucosa cell; Achilles tendon; cerebellar hemisphere; right hemisphere of cerebellum; pons; sural nerve; tendon of biceps brachii; synovial joint; synovial membrane / Top expressed in: lobe of cerebellum; cerebellar vermis; condyle; genital tubercle; endocardial cushion; atrioventricular valve; mandibular prominence; tail of embryo; atrium; trigeminal ganglion; More reference expression data
BioGPS	n/a
Gene ontology
Molecular function	DNA binding; protein domain specific binding; metal ion binding; nucleic acid binding; DNA-binding transcription factor activity, RNA polymerase II-specific
Cellular component	nucleus; extracellular region
Biological process	multicellular organism development; neuron fate commitment; cell differentiation; regulation of transcription, DNA-templated; transcription, DNA-templated; regulation of transcription by RNA polymerase II; negative regulation of endopeptidase activity
Sources:Amigo / QuickGO
Orthologs
Databases	NCBI: entry; OMA: entry
Species	Human	Mouse
Entrez	25925	225207
Ensembl	ENSG00000198795	ENSMUSG00000024420
UniProt	Q96K83; Q8IYZ2	Q6KAS7
RefSeq (mRNA)	NM_001308225; NM_015461	NM_145492; NM_001360804
RefSeq (protein)	NP_001295154; NP_056276; NP_001295154.1	NP_663467; NP_001347733
Location (UCSC)	Chr 18: 25.06 – 25.35 Mb	Chr 18: 13.82 – 14.11 Mb
PubMed search
- Wikidata
View/Edit Human	View/Edit Mouse

Zinc finger protein 521 is a protein that in humans is encoded by the ZNF521 gene. It was formerly named EHZF (early hematopoietic zinc finger protein), and is the human homolog of mouse EVI3/Zpf521.

== Function ==
ZNF521 is a nuclear protein and functions as a transcriptional regulator. ZNF521 has been shown to complex with SMAD1 and SMAD4, enhancing the transcriptional activity of a BMP2/4 responsive element, in response to BMP2. Further, it serves as an inhibitor of early B-cell factor (EBF1).

ZNF521 has been found to play a role in erythroid cell differentiation through direct binding with GATA-1. In hematopoietic cells, ZNF521 mRNA is widely expressed in CD34+ early hematopoietic progenitors, and its expression level declines rapidly during their differentiation.

== Structure ==
ZNF521 is a transcription factor with an N-terminal repressor motif and 30 Krüppel-like zinc finger (ZF)^{3} finger domains. Its N-terminal motif contains 12 amino acids, and is conserved among other ZF transcriptional repressors, including FOG-1, FOG-2, BCL11A, and SALL1.

== Clinical significance ==
ZNF521 mRNA has been detected in most cases of acute myelogenous leukemia (AML). It is expressed in several hematopoietic cell lines, such as K562 and HEL, derived from AML and CML at blast crisis.

Due to its action as a transcriptional inhibitor of EBF1, ZNF521 overexpression can lead to the inhibition of B-cell differentiation, and potential induction of B-cell malignancies. Monoallelic selection of EBF1 or PAX5, which is downstream of EBF1, has been found in B-progenitor acute lymphoblastic leukemia.

== Interactions ==
- SMAD1,
- SMAD4,
- GATA1,

== See also ==
- Zinc finger
