= MIR187 =

Identifiers
- Aliases: MIR187, MIRN187, miR-187, miRNA187, microRNA 187
- External IDs: OMIM: 612698; GeneCards: MIR187; OMA:MIR187 - orthologs

Gene location (Human)
Chr.	Chromosome 18 (human)
Band	18q12.2	Start	35,904,818 bp
Band	18q12.2	End	35,904,926 bp
RNA expression pattern
Bgee	Human / Mouse (ortholog); Top expressed in: olfactory zone of nasal mucosa; body of stomach; left ventricle; monocyte; blood; salivary gland; minor salivary glands; muscle layer of sigmoid colon; right auricle; subcutaneous adipose tissue / n/a; More reference expression data
BioGPS	n/a
Orthologs
Species	Human	Mouse
Entrez	406963	n/a
Ensembl	ENSG00000207797	n/a
UniProt	n a	n/a
RefSeq (mRNA)	n/a	n/a
RefSeq (protein)	n/a	n/a
Location (UCSC)	Chr 18: 35.9 – 35.9 Mb	n/a
PubMed search		n/a
- Wikidata
View/Edit Human

MicroRNA 187 is a protein that in humans is encoded by the MIR187 gene.

== Function ==
microRNAs (miRNAs) are short (20-24 nt) non-coding RNAs that are involved in post-transcriptional regulation of gene expression in multicellular organisms by affecting both the stability and translation of mRNAs. miRNAs are transcribed by RNA polymerase II as part of capped and polyadenylated primary transcripts (pri-miRNAs) that can be either protein-coding or non-coding. The primary transcript is cleaved by the Drosha ribonuclease III enzyme to produce an approximately 70-nt stem-loop precursor miRNA (pre-miRNA), which is further cleaved by the cytoplasmic Dicer ribonuclease to generate the mature miRNA and antisense miRNA star (miRNA*) products. The mature miRNA is incorporated into a RNA-induced silencing complex (RISC), which recognizes target mRNAs through imperfect base pairing with the miRNA and most commonly results in translational inhibition or destabilization of the target mRNA.
