= HAUS1 =

Protein-coding gene in the species Homo sapiens

Identifiers
- Aliases: HAUS1, CCDC5, HEI-C, HEIC, HsT1461, HAUS augmin like complex subunit 1
- External IDs: OMIM: 608775; MGI: 2385076; HomoloGene: 15516; GeneCards: HAUS1; OMA:HAUS1 - orthologs

Gene location (Mouse)
Chr.	Chromosome 18 (mouse)
Band	18|18 E3	Start	77,757,567 bp
Band	18|18 E3	End	77,767,780 bp
RNA expression pattern
Bgee	Human / Mouse (ortholog); Top expressed in: ganglionic eminence; monocyte; stromal cell of endometrium; rectum; Achilles tendon; smooth muscle tissue; bone marrow; gallbladder; lymph node; appendix / Top expressed in: spermatid; spermatocyte; yolk sac; testicle; epiblast; embryo; blastocyst; embryo; ventricular zone; bone marrow; More reference expression data
BioGPS	n/a
Gene ontology
Molecular function	protein binding; molecular function
Cellular component	microtubule organizing center; centrosome; spindle; spindle pole; microtubule; HAUS complex; cytoskeleton; cytoplasm; cytosol
Biological process	spindle assembly; cell cycle; cell division; G2/M transition of mitotic cell cycle; ciliary basal body-plasma membrane docking; centrosome cycle; regulation of G2/M transition of mitotic cell cycle
Sources:Amigo / QuickGO
Orthologs
Species	Human	Mouse
Entrez	115106	225745
Ensembl	n/a	ENSMUSG00000041840
UniProt	Q96CS2	Q8BHX1
RefSeq (mRNA)	NM_138443	NM_146089; NM_001357531; NM_001357532; NM_001357533
RefSeq (protein)	NP_612452	NP_666201; NP_001344460; NP_001344461; NP_001344462
Location (UCSC)	n/a	Chr 18: 77.76 – 77.77 Mb
PubMed search
- Wikidata
View/Edit Human	View/Edit Mouse

HAUS augmin-like complex subunit 1 is a protein that in humans is encoded by the HAUS1 gene.
