= CXXC1 =

Protein-coding gene in humans

Identifiers
- Aliases: CXXC1, 2410002I16Rik, 5830420C16Rik, CFP1, CGBP, HsT2645, PCCX1, PHF18, SPP1, ZCGPC1, hCGBP, CXXC finger protein 1
- External IDs: OMIM: 609150; MGI: 1921572; GeneCards: CXXC1
Available structures
PDB	Ortholog search: PDBe RCSB
PDB	List of PDB id codes 3QMB, 3QMC, 3QMD, 3QMG, 3QMH, 3QMI

Gene location (Human)
Chr.	Chromosome 18 (human)
Band	18q21.1	Start	50,282,343 bp
Band	18q21.1	End	50,287,839 bp

Gene location (Mouse)
Chr.	Chromosome 18 (mouse)
Band	18|18 E2	Start	74,349,195 bp
Band	18|18 E2	End	74,354,567 bp
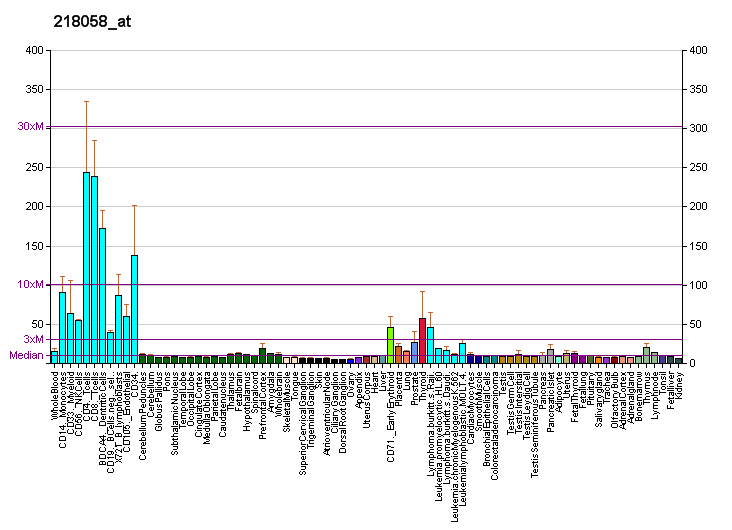

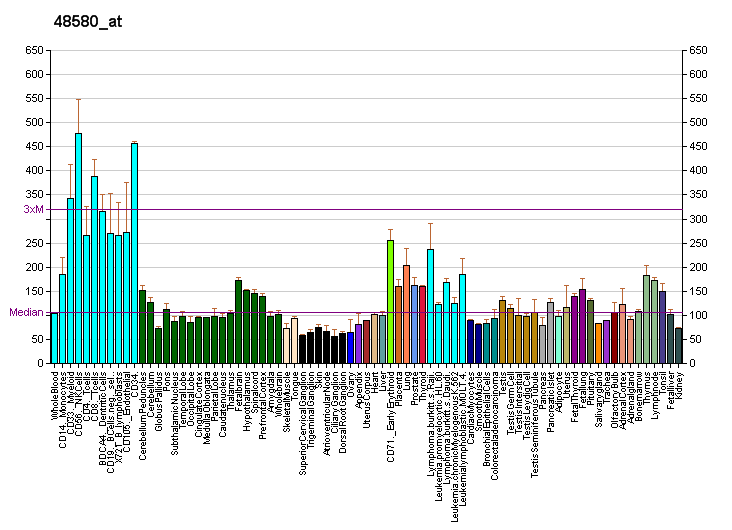
RNA expression pattern
Bgee	Human / Mouse (ortholog); Top expressed in: right hemisphere of cerebellum; body of pancreas; right uterine tube; pancreatic ductal cell; granulocyte; right lobe of thyroid gland; skin of leg; sural nerve; skin of abdomen; left lobe of thyroid gland / Top expressed in: Ileal epithelium; tail of embryo; genital tubercle; neural layer of retina; choroid plexus of fourth ventricle; lactiferous gland; entorhinal cortex; perirhinal cortex; secondary oocyte; otic vesicle; More reference expression data
BioGPS	More reference expression data
Gene ontology
Molecular function	DNA binding; zinc ion binding; protein binding; cis-regulatory region sequence-specific DNA binding; histone methyltransferase activity (H3-K4 specific); metal ion binding; unmethylated CpG binding; DNA-binding transcription factor activity, RNA polymerase II-specific
Cellular component	nuclear matrix; nuclear speck; nucleus; nucleoplasm; histone methyltransferase complex; cytosol; Set1C/COMPASS complex
Biological process	positive regulation of transcription, DNA-templated; IRE1-mediated unfolded protein response; histone H3-K4 methylation; regulation of transcription, DNA-templated; transcription, DNA-templated; regulation of transcription by RNA polymerase II
Sources:Amigo / QuickGO
Orthologs
Databases	NCBI: entry; OMA: entry
Species	Human	Mouse
Entrez	30827	74322
Ensembl	ENSG00000154832	ENSMUSG00000024560
UniProt	Q9P0U4	Q9CWW7
RefSeq (mRNA)	NM_001101654; NM_014593	NM_028868; NM_001378844
RefSeq (protein)	NP_001095124; NP_055408	NP_083144; NP_001365773
Location (UCSC)	Chr 18: 50.28 – 50.29 Mb	Chr 18: 74.35 – 74.35 Mb
PubMed search
- Wikidata
View/Edit Human	View/Edit Mouse

CpG-binding protein (CGBP) also known as CXXC-type zinc finger protein 1 (CXXC1) or PHD finger and CXXC domain-containing protein 1 (PCCX1) is a protein that in humans is encoded by the CXXC1 gene.

Proteins that contain a CXXC motif within their DNA-binding domain, such as CXXC1, recognize CpG sequences and regulate gene expression.

== See also ==
- PHD finger
- CXXC5
