= DIPK1C =

Identifiers
- Aliases: DIPK1C, C18orf51, family with sequence similarity 69 member C, divergent protein kinase domain 1C, FAM69C, FNCAD
- External IDs: OMIM: 614544; MGI: 3041188; GeneCards: DIPK1C

Gene location (Human)
Chr.	Chromosome 18 (human)
Band	18q22.3	Start	74,434,775 bp
Band	18q22.3	End	74,457,944 bp

Gene location (Mouse)
Chr.	Chromosome 18 (mouse)
Band	18|18 E4	Start	84,737,361 bp
Band	18|18 E4	End	84,758,561 bp
RNA expression pattern
Bgee	Human / Mouse (ortholog); Top expressed in: ventricular zone; putamen; endothelial cell; caudate nucleus; internal globus pallidus; amygdala; apex of heart; ganglionic eminence; substantia nigra; nucleus accumbens / Top expressed in: ventricular zone; lower lip; upper lip; vestibular labyrinth; retina; layer of retina; neural layer of retina; mesencephalon; embryo; rhombencephalon; More reference expression data
BioGPS	n/a
Orthologs
Databases	NCBI: entry; OMA: entry
Species	Human	Mouse
Entrez	125704	240479
Ensembl	ENSG00000187773	ENSMUSG00000047992
UniProt	Q0P6D2	Q8BQT2
RefSeq (mRNA)	NM_001044369	NM_173770
RefSeq (protein)	NP_001037834	NP_776131
Location (UCSC)	Chr 18: 74.43 – 74.46 Mb	Chr 18: 84.74 – 84.76 Mb
PubMed search
- Wikidata
View/Edit Human	View/Edit Mouse

Divergent protein kinase domain 1C is a protein that in humans is encoded by the DIPK1C gene.

== Function ==
This gene encodes a member of the divergent protein kinase domain family (DIPK) of cysteine-rich type II transmembrane proteins. These proteins localize to the endoplasmic reticulum but their specific functions are unknown.
