= Chromosome 18 =

Human chromosome

- Human chromosome 18 pair after G-banding. One is from mother, one is from father.

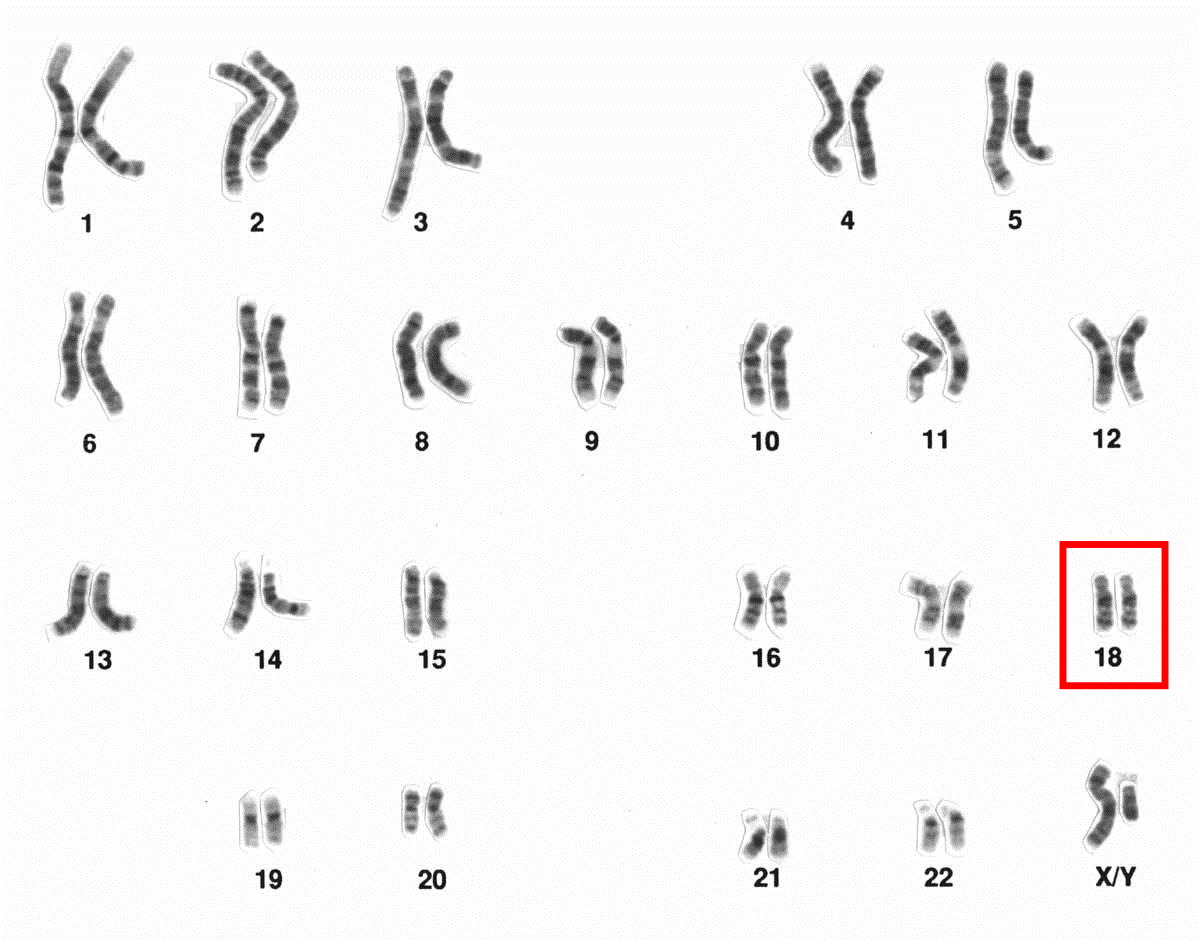
- Chromosome 18 pair in human male karyogram.

Features
- Length (bp): 80,542,538 bp (CHM13)
- No. of genes: 261 (CCDS)
- Type: Autosome
- Centromere position: Submetacentric (18.5 Mbp)

Complete gene lists
- CCDS: Gene list
- HGNC: Gene list
- UniProt: Gene list
- NCBI: Gene list

External map viewers
- Ensembl: Chromosome 18
- Entrez: Chromosome 18
- NCBI: Chromosome 18
- UCSC: Chromosome 18

Full DNA sequences
- RefSeq: NC_000018 (FASTA)
- GenBank: CM000680 (FASTA)

Chromosome 18 is one of the 23 pairs of chromosomes in humans. People normally have two copies of this chromosome. Chromosome 18 spans about 80 million base pairs (the building material of DNA) and represents about 2.5 percent of the total DNA in cells.

== Genes ==
=== Number of genes ===
The following are some of the gene count estimates of human chromosome 18. Because researchers use different approaches to genome annotation their predictions of the number of genes on each chromosome varies (for technical details, see gene prediction). Among various projects, the collaborative consensus coding sequence project (CCDS) takes an extremely conservative strategy. So CCDS's gene number prediction represents a lower bound on the total number of human protein-coding genes.

Estimated by	Protein-coding genes	Non-coding RNA genes	Pseudogenes	Source	Release date
CCDS	261	—	—		2016-09-08
HGNC	262	138	241		2017-05-12
Ensembl	268	608	247		2017-03-29
UniProt	276	—	—		2018-02-28
NCBI	285	432	304		2017-05-19

=== Gene list ===
The following is a partial list of genes on human chromosome 18. For complete list, see the link in the infobox on the right.

- ASXL3: encoding protein Additional sex combs like 3 (Drosophila)
- C18orf63: encoding protein Chromosome 18 open reading frame 63
- CABLES1: encoding protein CDK5 and ABL1 enzyme substrate 1
- CABYR: Calcium-binding tyrosine phosphorylation-regulated protein
- CHMP1B: Charged multivesicular body protein 1b
- CXXC1: CXXC-type zinc finger protein 1
- DCC: Deleted in Colorectal Cancer
- DIPK1C: encoding protein Divergent protein kinase domain 1C
- ELAC1: elaC ribonuclease Z 1
- ESCO1: encoding protein Establishment of sister chromatid cohesion N-acetyltransferase 1
- FECH: ferrochelatase (protoporphyria)
- GREB1L: encoding protein Growth regulation by estrogen in breast cancer-like
- HAUS1: HAUS augmin-like complex subunit 1
- HDHD2: encoding enzyme Haloacid dehalogenase-like hydrolase domain-containing protein 2
- IER3IP1: encoding protein Immediate early response 3-interacting protein 1
- MIR133A1: encoding microRNA MicroRNA 133a-1
- MIR187: encoding protein MicroRNA 187
- MRCL3: encoding protein Myosin regulatory light chain 12A
- NAPG: encoding protein Gamma-soluble NSF attachment protein
- NOL4: encoding protein Nucleolar protein 4
- NPC1: Niemann-Pick disease, type C1
- PIGN: encoding protein Phosphatidylinositol glycan anchor biosynthesis, class N
- PSTPIP2: encoding enzyme Proline-serine-threonine phosphatase-interacting protein 2
- RP11-267C16.1: non-coding
- SERPINB10: encoding protein Serpin peptidase inhibitor, clade B (ovalbumin), member 10
- SIGLEC15: encoding protein Sialic acid binding Ig-like lectin 15
- SMAD4: SMAD, mothers against DPP homolog 4 (Drosophila)
- TMEM241: encoding protein Transmembrane protein 241
- TTC39C: encoding protein Tetratricopeptide repeat protein 39C
- TWSG1: encoding protein Twisted gastrulation protein homolog 1
- ZCCHC2: encoding protein Zinc finger CCHC domain-containing protein 2
- ZFP161: encoding protein Zinc finger protein 161 homolog
- ZNF236: encoding protein Zinc finger protein 236
- ZNF516: encoding protein Zinc finger protein 516
- ZNF521: encoding protein Zinc finger protein 521
- ZNF532: encoding protein Zinc finger protein 532

== Diseases and disorders ==
The following diseases are some of those related to genes on chromosome 18:

- Erythropoietic protoporphyria
- Hereditary hemorrhagic telangiectasia
- Niemann–Pick disease type C
- Porphyria
- Selective mutism
- Edwards syndrome (trisomy 18)
- Tetrasomy 18p
- Monosomy 18p
- Pitt–Hopkins syndrome 18q21
- Distal 18q- (distal deletion)
- Proximal 18q- (proximal deletion)

== Cytogenetic band ==
G-banding ideograms of human chromosome 18

G-banding ideogram of human chromosome 18 in resolution 850 bphs. Band length in this diagram is proportional to base-pair length. This type of ideogram is generally used in genome browsers (e.g. Ensembl, UCSC Genome Browser).

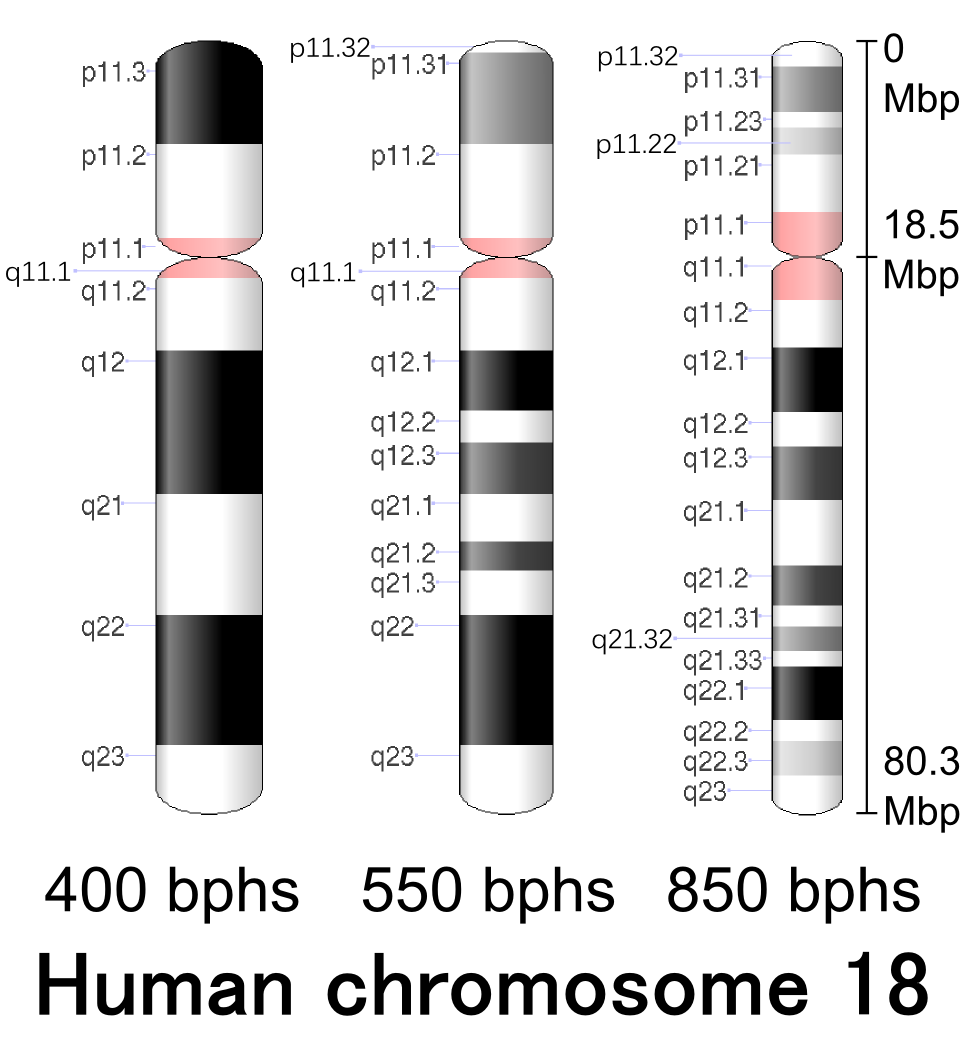
G-banding patterns of human chromosome 18 in three different resolutions (400, 550 and 850). Band length in this diagram is based on the ideograms from ISCN (2013). This type of ideogram represents actual relative band length observed under a microscope at the different moments during the mitotic process.

G-bands of human chromosome 18 in resolution 850 bphs
Chr.	Arm	Band	ISCN start	ISCN stop	Basepair start	Basepair stop	Stain	Density
18	p	11.32	0	159	1	2,900,000	gneg	
18	p	11.31	159	430	2,900,001	7,200,000	gpos	50
18	p	11.23	430	526	7,200,001	8,500,000	gneg	
18	p	11.22	526	685	8,500,001	10,900,000	gpos	25
18	p	11.21	685	1035	10,900,001	15,400,000	gneg	
18	p	11.1	1035	1290	15,400,001	18,500,000	acen	
18	q	11.1	1290	1561	18,500,001	21,500,000	acen	
18	q	11.2	1561	1847	21,500,001	27,500,000	gneg	
18	q	12.1	1847	2229	27,500,001	35,100,000	gpos	100
18	q	12.2	2229	2436	35,100,001	39,500,000	gneg	
18	q	12.3	2436	2755	39,500,001	45,900,000	gpos	75
18	q	21.1	2755	3153	45,900,001	50,700,000	gneg	
18	q	21.2	3153	3392	50,700,001	56,200,000	gpos	75
18	q	21.31	3392	3519	56,200,001	58,600,000	gneg	
18	q	21.32	3519	3663	58,600,001	61,300,000	gpos	50
18	q	21.33	3663	3758	61,300,001	63,900,000	gneg	
18	q	22.1	3758	4077	63,900,001	69,100,000	gpos	100
18	q	22.2	4077	4204	69,100,001	71,000,000	gneg	
18	q	22.3	4204	4411	71,000,001	75,400,000	gpos	25
18	q	23	4411	4650	75,400,001	80,373,285	gneg	
