= Establishment of sister chromatid cohesion =

Sister chromatid cohesion refers to the process by which sister chromatids are paired and held together during certain phases of the cell cycle. Establishment of sister chromatid cohesion is the process by which chromatin-associated cohesin protein becomes competent to physically bind together the sister chromatids. In general, cohesion is established during S phase as DNA is replicated, and is lost when chromosomes segregate during mitosis and meiosis. Some studies have suggested that cohesion aids in aligning the kinetochores during mitosis by forcing the kinetochores to face opposite cell poles.

== Cohesin loading ==
Cohesin first associates with the chromosomes during G1 phase. The cohesin ring is composed of two SMC (structural maintenance of chromosomes) proteins and two additional Scc proteins. Cohesin may originally interact with chromosomes via the ATPase domains of the SMC proteins. In yeast, the loading of cohesin on the chromosomes depends on proteins Scc2 and Scc4.

Cohesin interacts with the chromatin at specific loci. High levels of cohesin binding are observed at the centromere. Cohesin is also loaded at cohesin attachment regions (CARs) along the length of the chromosomes. CARs are approximately 500-800 base pair regions spaced at approximately 9 kilobase intervals along the chromosomes. In yeast, CARs tend to be rich in adenine-thymine base pairs. CARs are independent of origins of replication.

== Establishment of cohesion ==
Establishment of cohesion refers to the process by which chromatin-associated cohesin becomes cohesion-competent. Chromatin association of cohesin is not sufficient for cohesion. Cohesin must undergo subsequent modification ("establishment") to be capable of physically holding the sister chromosomes together. Though cohesin can associate with chromatin earlier in the cell cycle, cohesion is established during S phase. Early data suggesting that S phase is crucial to cohesion was based on the fact that after S phase, sister chromatids are always found in the bound state. Tying establishment to DNA replication allows the cell to institute cohesion as soon as the sister chromatids are formed. This solves the problem of how the cell might properly identify and pair sister chromatids by ensuring that the sister chromatids are never separate once replication has occurred.

The Eco1/Ctf7 gene (yeast) was one of the first genes to be identified as specifically required for the establishment of cohesion. Eco1 must be present in S phase to establish cohesion, but its continued presence is not required to maintain cohesion. Eco1 interacts with many proteins directly involved in DNA replication, including the processivity clamp PCNA, clamp loader subunits, and a DNA helicase. Though Eco1 contains several functional domains, it is the acetyltransferase activity of the protein which is crucial for establishment of cohesion. During S phase, Eco1 acetylates lysine residues in the Smc3 subunit of cohesin. Smc3 remains acetylated until at least anaphase. Once cohesin has been removed from the chromatin, Smc3 is deacetylated by Hos1.

The Pds5 gene was also identified in yeast as necessary for the establishment of cohesion. In humans, the gene has two homologs, Pds5A and Pds5B. Pds5 interacts with chromatin-associated cohesin. Pds5 is not strictly establishment-specific, as Pds5 is necessary for maintenance of cohesion during G2 and M phase. The loss of Pds5 negates the requirement for Eco1. As such, Pds5 is often termed an "anti-establishment" factor.

In addition to interacting with cohesin, Pds5 also interacts with Wapl (wings apart-like), another protein that has been implicated in the regulation of sister chromatid cohesion. Human Wapl binds cohesin through the Scc cohesin subunits (in humans, Scc1 and SA1). Wapl has been tied to the loss of cohesin from the chromatids during M phase. Wapl interacts with Pds5 through phenylalanine-glycine-phenylalanine (FGF) sequence motifs.

One model of establishment of cohesion suggests that establishment is mediated by the replacement of Wapl in the Wapl-Pds5-cohesin complex with the Sororin protein. Like Wapl, Sororin contains an FGF domain and is capable of interacting with Pds5. In this model, put forward by Nishiyama et al., Wapl interacts with Pds5 and cohesin during G1, before establishment. During S phase, Eco1 (Esco1/Esco2 in humans) acetylates Smc3. This results in recruitment of Sororin. Sororin then replaces Wapl in the Pds5-cohesin complex. This new complex is the established, cohesion-competent cohesin state. At entry to mitosis, Sororin is phosphorylated and replaced again by Wapl, leading to loss of cohesion. Sororin also has chromatin binding activity independent of its ability to mediate cohesion.

== Meiosis ==
Cohesion proteins SMC1ß, SMC3, REC8 and STAG3 appear to participate in the cohesion of sister chromatids throughout the meiotic process in human oocytes. SMC1ß, REC8 and STAG3 are meiosis specific cohesin proteins. The STAG3 protein is essential for female meiosis and fertility. Cohesins are involved in meiotic recombination.

== Ties to DNA replication ==
A growing body of evidence ties establishment of cohesion to DNA replication. As mentioned above, functional coupling of these two processes prevents the cell from having to later distinguish which chromosomes are sisters by ensuring that the sister chromatids are never separate after replication.

Another significant tie between DNA replication and cohesion pathways is through Replication Factor C (RFC). This complex, the "clamp loader," is responsible for loading PCNA onto DNA. An alternative form of RFC is required for sister chromatin cohesion. This alternative form is composed of core RFC proteins RFC2, RFC3, RFC4, and RFC5, but replaces the RFC1 protein with cohesion specific proteins Ctf8, Ctf18, and Dcc1. A similar function-specific alternative RFC (replacing RFC1 with Rad24) plays a role in the DNA damage checkpoint. The presence of an alternative RFC in the cohesion pathway can be interpreted as evidence in support of the polymerase switch model for cohesion establishment. Like the non-cohesion RFC, the cohesion RFC loads PCNA onto DNA.

Some of the evidence tying cohesion and DNA replication comes from the multiple interactions of Eco1. Eco1 interacts with PCNA, RFC subunits, and a DNA helicase, Chl1, either physically or genetically. Studies have also found replication-linked proteins which influence cohesion independent of Eco1. The Ctf18 subunit of the cohesion-specific RFC can interact with cohesin subunits Smc1 and Scc1.

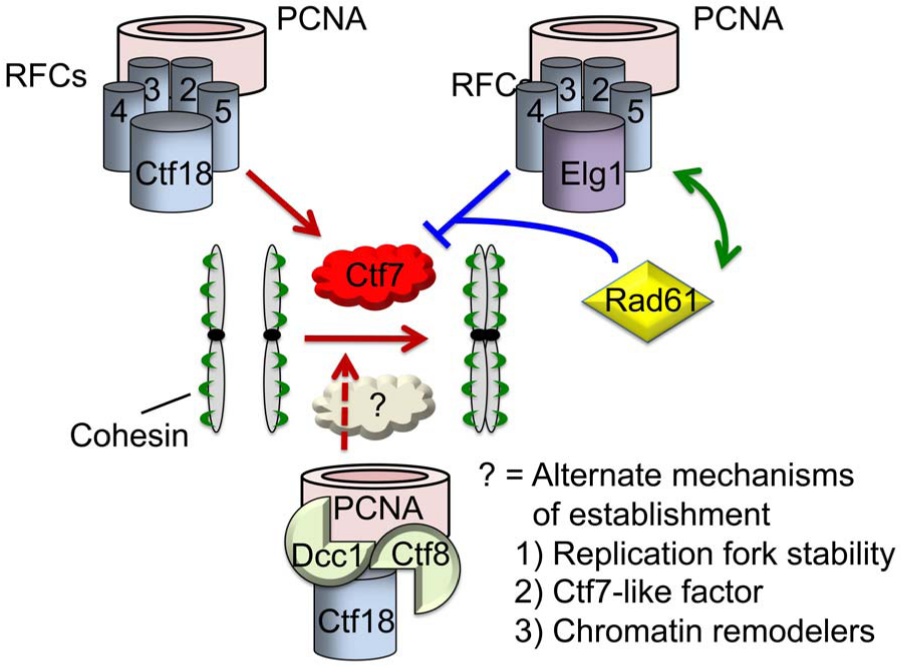
Hypothesized model for the pro- and anti-establishment functions of replication factor C complexes in sister chromatid cohesion.

=== Polymerase switch model ===
Though the protein was originally identified as a Topoisomerase I redundant factor, the TRF4 gene product was later shown to be required for sister chromatid cohesion. Wang et al. showed that Trf4 is actually a DNA polymerase, which they called Polymerase κ. This polymerase is also referred to as Polymerase σ. In the same paper in which they identified Pol σ, Wang et al. suggested a polymerase switch model for establishment of cohesion. In this model, upon reaching a CAR, the cell switches DNA polymerases in a mechanism similar to that used in Okazaki fragment synthesis. The cell off-loads the processive replication polymerase and instead uses Pol σ for synthesis of the CAR region. It has been suggested that the cohesion-specific RFC could function in off-loading or on-loading PNCA and polymerases in such a switch.

== Ties to DNA damage pathways ==
Changes in patterns of sister chromatid cohesion have been observed in cases of DNA damage. Cohesin is required for repair of DNA double-strand breaks (DSBs). One mechanism of DSB repair, homologous recombination (HR), requires the presence of the sister chromatid for repair at the break site. Thus, it is possible that cohesion is required for this process because it ensures that the sister chromatids are physically close enough to undergo HR. DNA damage can lead to cohesin loading at non-CAR sites and establishment of cohesion at these sites even during G2 phase. In the presence of ionizing radiation (IR), the Smc1 subunit of cohesin is phosphorylated by the ataxia telangiectasia mutated (ATM) kinase. ATM is a key kinase in the DNA damage checkpoint. Defects in cohesion can increase genome instability, a result consistent with the ties between cohesion and DNA damage pathways.

In the bacterium Escherichia coli, repair of mitomycin C-induced DNA damages occurs by a sister chromatid cohesion process involving the RecN protein. Sister chromatid interaction followed by homologous recombination appears to significantly contribute to the repair of DNA double-strand damages.

== Medical relevance ==
Defects in the establishment of sister chromatid cohesion have serious consequences for the cell and are therefore tied to many human diseases. Failure to establish cohesion correctly or inappropriate loss of cohesion can lead to missegregation of chromosomes during mitosis, which results in aneuploidy. The loss of the human homologs of core cohesin proteins or of Eco1, Pds5, Wapl, Sororin, or Scc2 has been tied to cancer. Mutations affecting cohesion and establishment of cohesion are also responsible for Cornelia de Lange Syndrome and Roberts Syndrome. Diseases arising from defects in cohesin or other proteins involved in sister chromatid cohesion are referred to as cohesinopathies.

=== Cornelia de Lange Syndrome ===
Genetic alterations in genes NIPBL, SMC1A, SMC3, RAD21 and HDAC8 are associated with Cornelia de Lange Syndrome. The proteins encoded by these genes all function in the chromosome cohesion pathway that is employed in the cohesion of sister chromatids during mitosis, DNA repair, chromosome segregation and the regulation of developmental gene expression. Defects in these functions likely underlie many of the features of Cornelia de Lang Syndrome.
