= DNA polymerase III subunit gamma/tau =

DNA polymerase III tau subunit V interacting with alpha

Identifiers
- Symbol: DNA_pol_III_sug/sutau
- Pfam: PF12170
- InterPro: IPR012763
Available protein structures:
- PDB: IPR012763 PF12170 (ECOD; PDBsum)
- AlphaFold: IPR012763; PF12170

The τ and γ subunits are part of the DNA polymerase III holoenzyme of prokaryotes. The protein family is characterized by the well-conserved first N-terminal domain, approx. 365 amino acids. The eukaryotic equivalent to the DNA clamp loader is replication factor C, with the subunits RFC1, RFC2, RFC3, RFC4, and RFC5.

The domain is also found in plants as gene STICHEL (STI), with similarity to cyanobacterial sequences. However, STI in plants is nuclear-localized and does not participate in genome duplication. It seems to instead regulate branching.
