= Shugoshin N terminal protein domain =

Shugoshin_N

Identifiers
- Symbol: Shugoshin_N
- Pfam: PF07558
- InterPro: IPR011516
Available protein structures:
- Pfam: structures / ECOD
- PDB: RCSB PDB; PDBe; PDBj
- PDBsum: structure summary

In molecular biology, the protein domain named the Shugoshin N-terminal coiled-coil region is a domain found on the N-terminal region of the Shugoshin protein in eukaryotes. It has a role in attaching to the kinetochores, structures on the chromatids where microtubules attach. Shugoshin has a conserved coiled-coil N-terminal domain and a highly conserved C-terminal region. Shugoshin is a crucial target of Bub1 kinase that plays a central role in the cohesion of chromosomes during cell division.

== Function ==
=== Shugoshin protein ===
The protein, Shugoshin, is actually Japanese for guardian spirit. Just as its name suggests, the Shugoshin protein guides chromosome cohesion during cell division. It does this by preventing the cohesin complex, which regulates chromatid separation, from prematurely dissociating. Shugoshin protein is thought to act by protecting two proteins, named Rec8 and Rad21 at the centromeres from protein degradation by the enzyme separase. This results in the sister chromatids remaining tethered.

Shugoshin also acts as a spindle checkpoint component. It senses tension between sister chromatids during mitosis, and it degrades when they separate preventing cell cycle arrest and chromosome loss. Human shugoshin is diffusible and mediates formation of kinetochore-microtubules during bipolar spindle assembly.

=== N terminal domain ===
Recent studies indicate that the structure of the N-terminal Shugoshin may be important for centromeric localisation, this is because it has been observed that the N-terminal fragment was the only part of the protein to localise at the centromere. Another study has shown that the N-terminal region bundles short microtubules in vitro. This suggests that the N-terminal domain has a function in bundling microtubules at the centromere.

== Structure ==
The N-terminal domain of the Shugoshin protein is a coiled-coil which can be further described as a homodimeric parallel coiled-coil.
