= CTF8 =

Protein-coding gene in the species Homo sapiens

CHTF8

Identifiers
- Aliases: CHTF8, CTF8, DERPC, chromosome transmission fidelity factor 8
- External IDs: OMIM: 613202; MGI: 2443370; HomoloGene: 84588; GeneCards: CHTF8; OMA:CHTF8 - orthologs

Gene location (Human)
Chr.	Chromosome 16 (human)
Band	16q22.1	Start	69,118,010 bp
Band	16q22.1	End	69,132,588 bp

Gene location (Mouse)
Chr.	Chromosome 8 (mouse)
Band	8|8 D3	Start	107,610,495 bp
Band	8|8 D3	End	107,620,233 bp
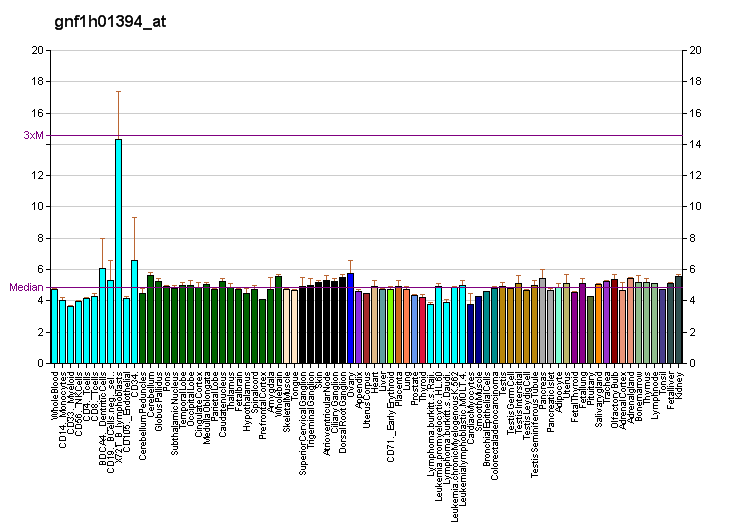

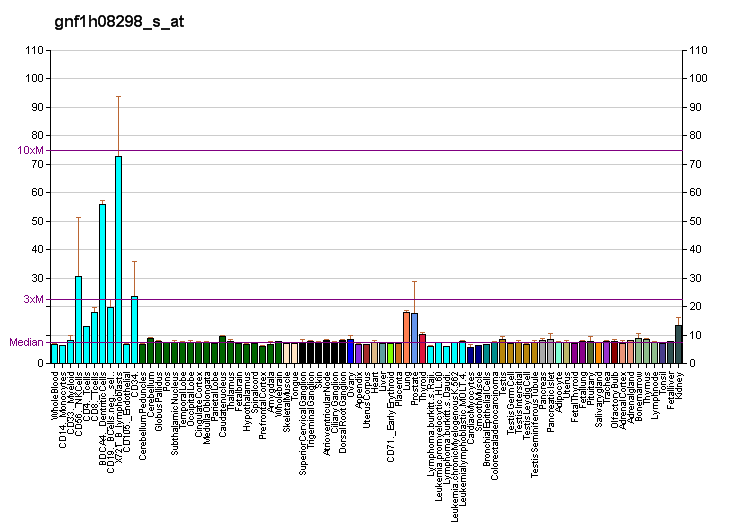

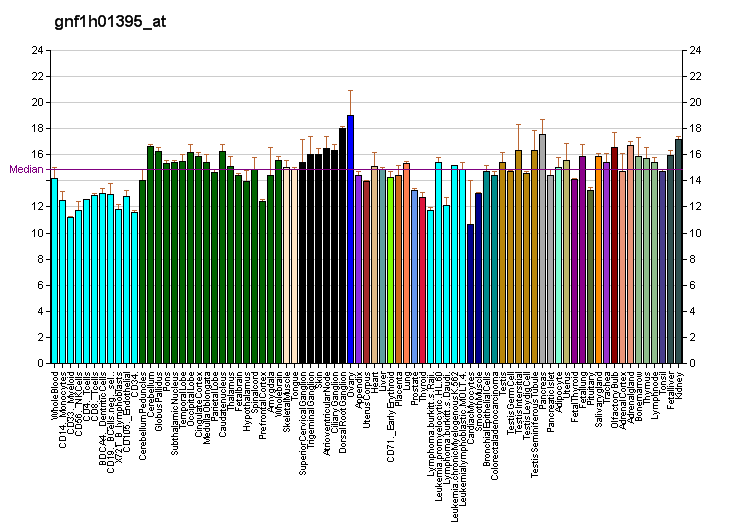
RNA expression pattern
Bgee	Human / Mouse (ortholog); Top expressed in: granulocyte; human kidney; mucosa of transverse colon; apex of heart; monocyte; islet of Langerhans; right lobe of liver; smooth muscle tissue; right lobe of thyroid gland; fallopian tube / Top expressed in: yolk sac; tail of embryo; ventricular zone; thymus; lip; lens; lung; genital tubercle; neural layer of retina; spleen; More reference expression data
BioGPS	More reference expression data
Gene ontology
Molecular function	DNA binding; DNA clamp loader activity; single-stranded DNA helicase activity
Cellular component	nucleus; extracellular exosome; nucleoplasm; Ctf18 RFC-like complex
Biological process	mitotic sister chromatid cohesion; DNA replication; cell cycle; positive regulation of DNA-directed DNA polymerase activity
Sources:Amigo / QuickGO
Orthologs
Species	Human	Mouse
Entrez	54921	214987
Ensembl	ENSG00000168802	ENSMUSG00000046691
UniProt	P0CG12; P0CG13	P0CG14; P0CG15
RefSeq (mRNA)	NM_001039690; NM_001040145; NM_001040146; NM_017804	NM_145412; NM_001364186
RefSeq (protein)	NP_001034779; NP_001035236; NP_001034779.1; NP_001035236.1	NP_663387; NP_001351115; NP_663387.3
Location (UCSC)	Chr 16: 69.12 – 69.13 Mb	Chr 8: 107.61 – 107.62 Mb
PubMed search
- Wikidata
View/Edit Human	View/Edit Mouse

Chromosome transmission fidelity protein 8 homolog is a protein that in humans is encoded by the CHTF8 gene.

This gene encodes a short protein that forms part of the Ctf18 replication factor C (RFC) complex that occurs in both yeast and mammals. The heteroheptameric RFC complex plays a role in sister chromatid cohesion and may load the replication clamp PCNA (proliferating cell nuclear antigen) onto DNA during DNA replication and repair.

This gene is ubiquitously expressed and has been shown to have reduced expression in renal and prostate tumors. Alternative splicing results in multiple variants encoding different isoforms. This gene has a pseudogene on chromosome X.
