= C17orf58 =

Human gene

Identifiers
- Aliases: C17orf58, chromosome 17 open reading frame 58
- External IDs: MGI: 1916316; HomoloGene: 45640; GeneCards: C17orf58; OMA:C17orf58 - orthologs

Gene location (Human)
Chr.	Chromosome 17 (human)
Band	17q24.2	Start	67,991,099 bp
Band	17q24.2	End	67,996,469 bp

Gene location (Mouse)
Chr.	Chromosome 11 (mouse)
Band	11|11 E1	Start	107,025,681 bp
Band	11|11 E1	End	107,030,443 bp
RNA expression pattern
Bgee	Human / Mouse (ortholog); Top expressed in: synovial joint; vena cava; vulva; epithelium of lactiferous gland; lactiferous duct; synovial membrane; bronchial epithelial cell; placenta; urethra; germinal epithelium / Top expressed in: right lung lobe; left lung lobe; morula; neural layer of retina; primary oocyte; embryo; embryo; respiratory epithelium; nasal epithelium; olfactory epithelium; More reference expression data
BioGPS	n/a
Orthologs
Species	Human	Mouse
Entrez	284018	69066
Ensembl	ENSG00000186665	ENSMUSG00000078607
UniProt	Q2M2W7	Q08AU9
RefSeq (mRNA)	NM_181655; NM_181656; NM_001382359	NM_001163473; NM_001372502; NM_001372503; NM_001372504
RefSeq (protein)	NP_858041; NP_858042; NP_001369288	NP_001156945; NP_001359431; NP_001359432; NP_001359433
Location (UCSC)	Chr 17: 67.99 – 68 Mb	Chr 11: 107.03 – 107.03 Mb
PubMed search
- Wikidata
View/Edit Human	View/Edit Mouse

Chromosome 17 open reading frame 58 or C17orf58 is a protein coding human gene that located in collagen-containing extracellular matrix and encodes protein C17orf58 isoform c precursor.

== Gene ==
C17orf58 is a protein which in humans is the longest isoform encoded by the C17orf58 gene. C17orf58, also known as chromosome 17 open reading frame 58, is located on the negative strand of chromosome 17 (17q24.2) from 67,991,099 to 67,996,469, spanning 5,371 base pairs.

=== Expression ===
- Gene

Gene expressed variably and ubiquitously at a moderate and high level across many tissues in humans. The gene has high tissue specificity with enhanced expression in the placenta. The gene has low cell type specificity and immune cell specificity, but enriched in fibroblasts and cardiomyocytes. Expression clusters are associated with ECM organization in tissues and fibroblasts, and with innate immunity in immune cells.

== Clinical significance ==
C17orf58 is a prognostic marker in Kidney renal papillary cell carcinoma. Recent research has observed overexpression of C17orf58 in T-cell lymphomas and leukemias. Since the RNA expression is relatively low in most normal cell, and C17ORF58 knockdown in T-cell lines results in the upregulation of numerous pro-apoptotic genes, it suggests that increased expression of c17orf58 might linked with the proliferation of malignant T cells.

== mRNA ==
C17orf58 contains four exons. There are 3 different transcript variants in humans through alternative splicing: transcript variant 1, transcript variant 2, transcript variant 3(see Table 1).

Table 1. Transcripts of C17orf58 and related properties
Transcript variant	Accession number	Length(nt)	Exons	Protein isoform	Protein Accession number	Length(aa)
variant 1	NM_181655.4	1,380 nt	1,2,3	isoform a	NP_858041.2	97
variant 2	NM_181656.5	1,523 nt	1,2,3	isoform b	NP_858042.2	75
variant 3	NM_001382359.1	2,105 nt	1,2,3,4	isoform c	NP_001369288.1	339

== Protein ==
UPF0450 protein C17orf58 isoform c precursor is the longest isoform of c17orf58 protein. It consists of 339 amino acids. It has a molecular mass of 37~kDa and its PI is approximately 10. The protein is expressed in the nucleus in most tissues and localized to the plasma membrane and in the cytosol.

=== Composition ===
C17orf58 protein is highly enriched of Arginine (R), Alanine (A) and Proline (P) and has lower amount of Threonine (T), Hydrophobic cluster (FIKMNY) and Aliphatic hydrophobic (LVIFM).

=== Domain ===
The protein has three domains: Netrin-like domain, PRK07764 (DNA polymerase III subunits gamma and tau) and TIMP-like_OB-fold.

=== Structure ===
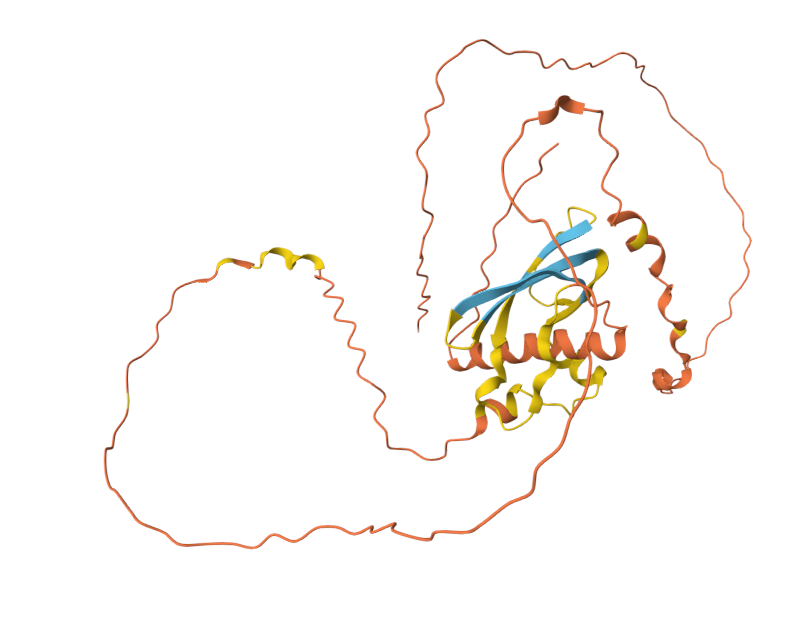
C17orf58 protein (UPF0450) structure prediction using AlphaFold Protein Structure Database.

=== Protein interactions ===
Table 2. Interactants with C17orf58 protein.

Protein symbol	Protein name	Description
MYSM1	Myb like, SWIRM and MPN domains 1	a specific tag for epigenetic transcriptional repression, acting as a coactivator.
SMARCB1	SWI/SNF related BAF chromatin remodeling complex subunit B1	An ATP- dependent chromatin-remodeling complex plays roles in cell proliferation and differentiation.
BPTF	bromodomain PHD finger transcription factor	a complex which catalyzes ATP-dependent nucleosome sliding and facilitates transcription of chromatin.
PBRM1	polybromo 1	Acts as a negative regulator of cell proliferation.
ANKFN1	Ankyrin repeat and fibronectin type III domain containing 1.	Predicted to be involved in establishment of mitotic spindle orientation.
SMARCE1	SWI/SNF related BAF chromatin remodeling complex subunit E1	Involved in transcriptional activation.
SLC35G1	solute carrier family 35 member G1	negative regulator of plasma membrane calcium-transporting ATPases preventing calcium efflux from the cell
C1QTNF4	C1q and TNF related 4	May be involved in the regulation of the inflammatory network.
OR7D2	olfactory receptor family 7 subfamily D member 2	G-protein-coupled receptors. Located in the nose.

== Conceptual translation ==
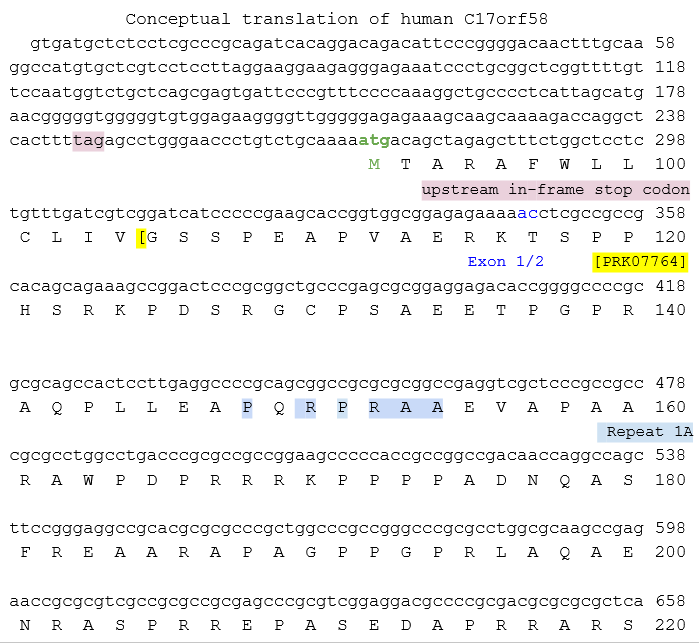
Conceptual translation of human c17orf58 contains first 220 amino acids

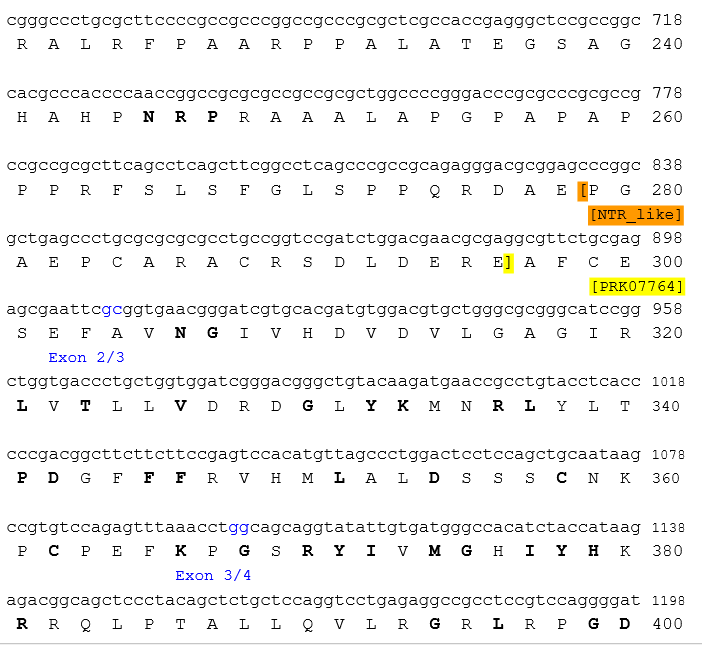
Conceptual translation of human c17orf58 second 160 amino acids

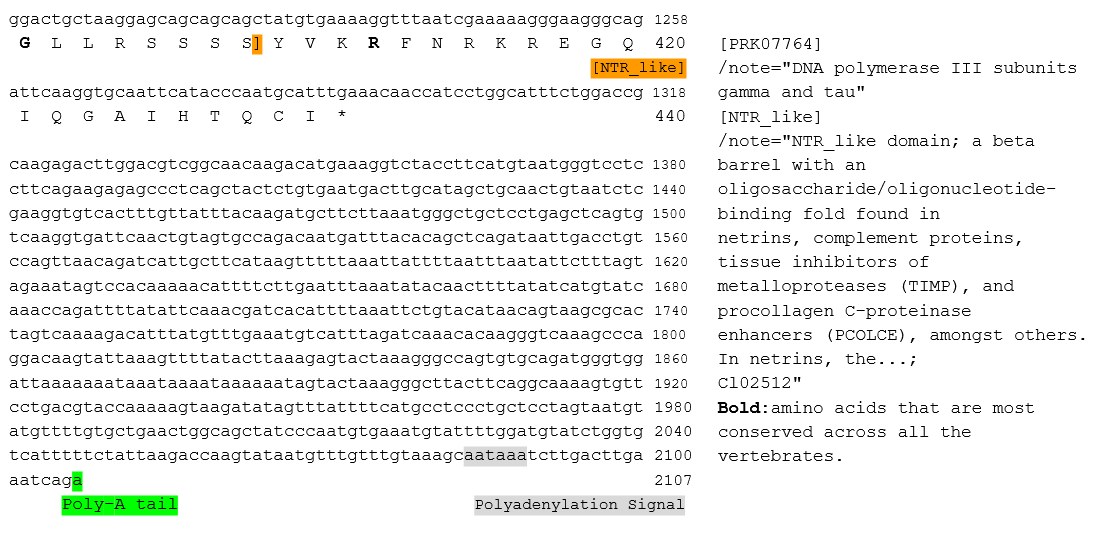
Conceptual translation of human c17orf58

== Evolution ==
C17orf58 orthologs are found in mammals, birds/reptiles, amphibians and fish but not in any invertebrates( See Table 3). C17orf58 first appeared approximately 429 millions years ago in fish. C17orf58 does not belong to a multi-gene family. While the gene in humans has evolved alternative splicing to produce multiple isoforms, there are no known alternate splice isoforms of the c17orf58 protein found within the most distantly related Engraulis encrasicolus.

Table 3. c17orf58 orthologs and related properties. It shows 8 orthologs of the c17orf58 in mammals, birds & reptiles, amphibians and fishes. Collected data are from NCBI, Time-Tree, and analyzed using EMBOSS NEEDLE.

Genus and species	Common name	Taxonomic group	Date of divergence from the human lineage(MYA)	Accession number	sequence length (aa)	sequence identity to human protein	sequence similarity to human protein
Mammal	Human	Primates	0	NP_001369288.1	339aa	100%	100%
Mammal	Chlorocebus sabaeus	Monkey	43	XP_072861199.1	341aa	96%	96%
Mammal	Eschrichtius robustus	Whales	94	XP_068386886.1	331aa	82%	86%
Birds	Rhea pennata	Birds	319	XP_062447700.1	381aa	41%	52%
Reptiles	Lepidochelys kempii	Turtles	319	XP_073166835.1	389aa	41%	49%
Amphibian	Ambystoma mexicanum	Salamanders	352	XP_069511122.1	397aa	59%	77%
Amphibian	Xenopus laevis	Frogs	352	XP_018089386.1	399 aa	56%	71%
Fish	Pangasianodon hypophthalmus	Ray-finned Fishes	429	XP_026788945.1	384 aa	52%	69%
Fish	Engraulis encrasicolus	Ray-finned Fishes	429	XP_063050989.1	393 aa	39%	54%
