= SMC1B =

Protein-coding gene in the species Homo sapiens

Identifiers
- Aliases: SMC1B, SMC1BETA, SMC1L2, structural maintenance of chromosomes 1B
- External IDs: OMIM: 608685; MGI: 2154049; GeneCards: SMC1B

Gene location (Human)
Chr.	Chromosome 22 (human)
Band	22q13.31	Start	45,344,063 bp
Band	22q13.31	End	45,413,619 bp

Gene location (Mouse)
Chr.	Chromosome 15 (mouse)
Band	15|15 E2	Start	84,948,890 bp
Band	15|15 E2	End	85,016,165 bp
RNA expression pattern
Bgee	Human / Mouse (ortholog); Top expressed in: testicle; right testis; left testis; gonad; buccal mucosa cell; monocyte; Achilles tendon; lymph node; tonsil; appendix / Top expressed in: spermatid; spermatocyte; seminiferous tubule; zygote; secondary oocyte; primary oocyte; morula; ovary; Gonadal ridge; embryo; More reference expression data
BioGPS	n/a
Gene ontology
Molecular function	DNA binding; nucleotide binding; ATP binding
Cellular component	lateral element; condensed nuclear chromosome; synaptonemal complex; chromosome, centromeric region; nucleus; nucleoplasm; chromosome; meiotic cohesin complex; cytosol
Biological process	cell cycle; meiosis; chromosome organization; sister chromatid cohesion
Sources:Amigo / QuickGO
Orthologs
Databases	NCBI: entry; OMA: entry
Species	Human	Mouse
Entrez	27127	140557
Ensembl	ENSG00000077935	ENSMUSG00000022432
UniProt	Q8NDV3	Q920F6
RefSeq (mRNA)	NM_001291501; NM_148674	NM_080470
RefSeq (protein)	NP_001278430; NP_683515	NP_536718
Location (UCSC)	Chr 22: 45.34 – 45.41 Mb	Chr 15: 84.95 – 85.02 Mb
PubMed search
- Wikidata
View/Edit Human	View/Edit Mouse

Structural maintenance of chromosomes protein 1B (SMC-1B) is a protein that in humans is encoded by the SMC1B gene. SMC proteins engage in chromosome organization and can be broken into 3 groups based on function which are cohesins, condensins, and DNA repair. SMC-1B belongs to a family of proteins required for chromatid cohesion and DNA recombination during meiosis and mitosis. SMC1B protein appears to participate with other cohesins REC8, STAG3 and SMC3 in sister-chromatid cohesion throughout the whole meiotic process in human oocytes.

== Function ==
SMC1B is essential for meiosis in which it has 3 main roles. SMC1B is known to be involved in the fusion of chromosomes during meiosis in both homologous and non-homologous chromosomes. SMC1B develops the axial elements (AE) found in synaptonemal complexes in association with other cohesin proteins REC8 and SMC3 as well as AE proteins SCP2 and SCP3. Sister chromatid cohesion in meiosis is supplied by SMC1B. SMC1B can also protect telomeres from damage, something that SMC1A has not been shown to be capable of. Additionally, in somatic cells SMC1B associates with SMC3 and RAD21 in a mitotic cohesin complex which had been thought to only include SMC1α. Depletion of SMC1B in somatic cells showed dysregulation of some gene expression.

== Clinical Significance ==
=== Human Papillomavirus (HPV) ===
Human Papillomavirus (HPV) is a DNA virus and the most prevalent sexually transmitted infection. HPV-16 and HPV-18 are responsible for most cases of cervical cancer from HPV. SMC1B has increased expression in HPV(+) cases. HPV recruits SMC1 along with a transcriptional factor, CTCF, to enable replication of the virus's genome. SMC1 is crucially important to the regulation of the virus life cycle.

=== Genome Instability and Cancer ===
SMC1B protects genetic stability from ultraviolet and infrared radiation. Altered expression of SMC1B can cause DNA damage repair to fail that then causes genome instability. Expression of SMC1B higher or lower than normal is associated with certain cancers. Meiotic subunits STAG3 and REC8 are also expressed with SMC1B in cancers. High expression of SMC1B can be associated with pancreatic cancers and ovarian cancer, while low expression increases the risk of cancer progression due to low genetic stability.
