= REC8 =

Protein-coding gene in the species Homo sapiens

Identifiers
- Aliases: REC8, HR21spB, REC8L1, Rec8p, REC8 meiotic recombination protein
- External IDs: OMIM: 608193; MGI: 1929645; HomoloGene: 3768; GeneCards: REC8; OMA:REC8 - orthologs

Gene location (Human)
Chr.	Chromosome 14 (human)
Band	14q12	Start	24,171,853 bp
Band	14q12	End	24,180,257 bp

Gene location (Mouse)
Chr.	Chromosome 14 (mouse)
Band	14 C3|14 28.19 cM	Start	55,855,494 bp
Band	14 C3|14 28.19 cM	End	55,862,852 bp
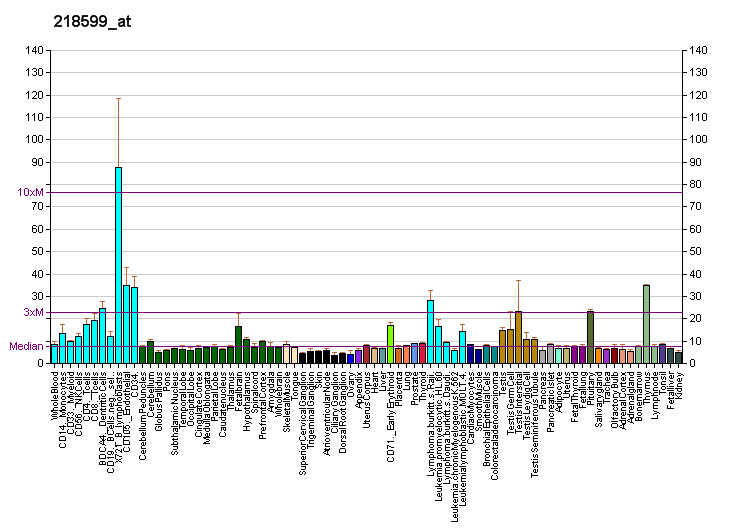
RNA expression pattern
Bgee	Human / Mouse (ortholog); Top expressed in: anterior pituitary; ganglionic eminence; right uterine tube; right hemisphere of cerebellum; ventricular zone; bone marrow; gallbladder; body of stomach; right testis; bone marrow cells / Top expressed in: spermatid; seminiferous tubule; duodenum; urethra; islet of Langerhans; seminal vesicula; blastocyst; morula; neural layer of retina; adrenal gland; More reference expression data
BioGPS	More reference expression data
Gene ontology
Molecular function	chromatin binding
Cellular component	male germ cell nucleus; chromosome; lateral element; condensed nuclear chromosome; nuclear chromosome; synaptonemal complex; chromosome, centromeric region; nucleus; condensed chromosome; meiotic cohesin complex; cohesin complex
Biological process	reciprocal meiotic recombination; chromosome segregation; male meiosis I; sister chromatid cohesion; seminiferous tubule development; homologous chromosome pairing at meiosis; oocyte maturation; double-strand break repair via homologous recombination; synaptonemal complex assembly; spermatogenesis; spermatid development; fertilization; double-strand break repair; meiosis
Sources:Amigo / QuickGO
Orthologs
Species	Human	Mouse
Entrez	9985	56739
Ensembl	ENSG00000100918	ENSMUSG00000002324
UniProt	O95072	Q8C5S7
RefSeq (mRNA)	NM_001048205; NM_005132	NM_020002; NM_001360389; NM_001360390
RefSeq (protein)	NP_001041670; NP_005123	NP_064386; NP_001347318; NP_001347319
Location (UCSC)	Chr 14: 24.17 – 24.18 Mb	Chr 14: 55.86 – 55.86 Mb
PubMed search
- Wikidata
View/Edit Human	View/Edit Mouse

Meiotic recombination protein REC8 homolog is a protein that in humans is encoded by the REC8 gene.

Rec8 is a meiosis-specific component of the cohesin complex that binds sister chromatids in preparation for the two divisions of meiosis. Rec8 is sequentially removed from sister chromatids. It is removed from the arms of chromosomes in the first division - separating homologous chromosomes from each other. However, Rec8 is maintained at centromeres so that sister chromatids are kept joined until anaphase of meiosis II, at which point removal of remaining cohesin leads to the separation of sister chromatids.

== Function ==
This gene encodes a member of the kleisin family of SMC (structural maintenance of chromosome) protein partners. The protein localizes to the axial elements of chromosomes during meiosis in both oocytes and spermatocytes. REC8 protein appears to participate with other cohesins STAG3, SMC1B and SMC3 in sister chromatid cohesion throughout the whole meiotic process in human oocytes. In the mouse, the homologous protein is a key component of the meiotic cohesion complex, which regulates sister chromatid cohesion and recombination between homologous chromosomes. Multiple alternatively spliced variants, encoding the same protein, have been found for this gene.

Rec8 remains in complex with SMC proteins until anaphase, where it is degraded by Separase once the spindle assembly checkpoint is bypassed. Unlike the other Kleisin family member, Scc1, Rec8 must be phosphorylated prior to degradation. Prior to anaphase, Rec8 is protected from phosphorylation by Protein Phosphatase 2 (PP2A-B56) in mouse. PP2A is recruited to cohesin by Shugoshin 2 (Sgo2; SGOL2 in yeast). Bypass of the spindle assembly checkpoint activates Separase, which then degrades phosphorylated Rec8 and untethers Cohesin from sister chromatids, allowing for segregation of chromosomes.

== Interactions ==
REC8 has been shown to interact with SMC3.
