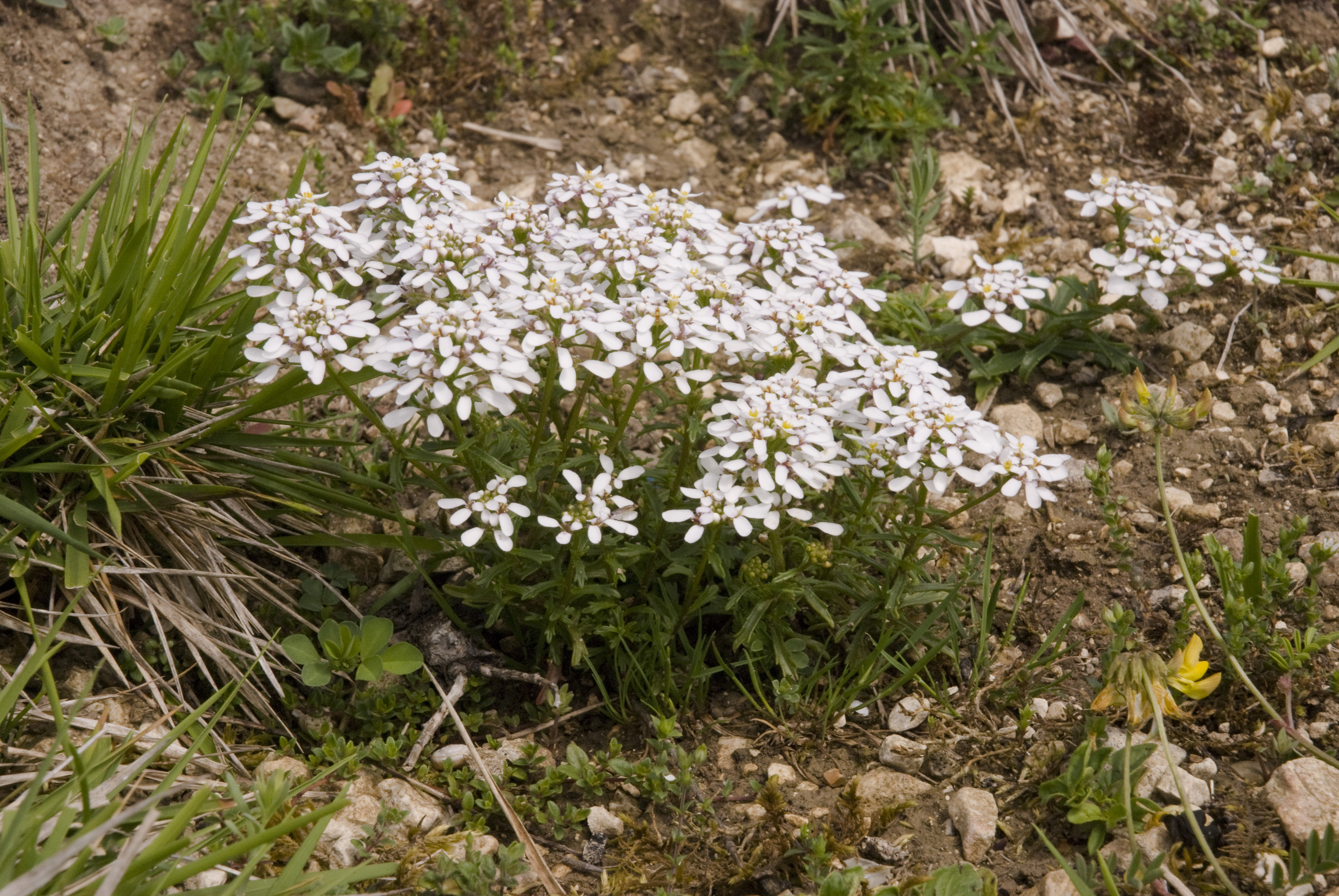
- In bloom at the Somme in May
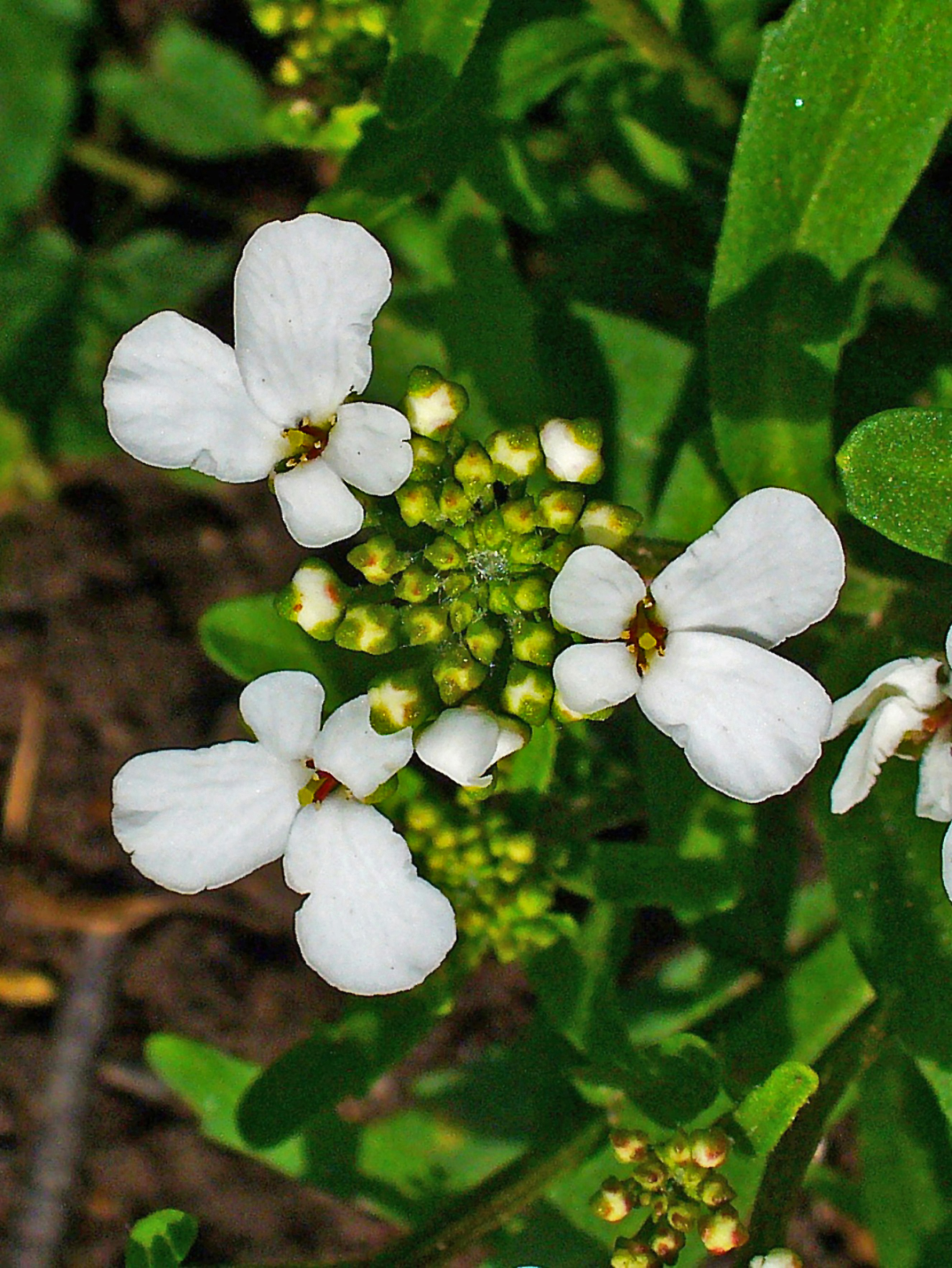
- Close up of flowers, showing asymmetrical petal arrangement

Scientific classification
- Kingdom: Plantae
- Clade: Tracheophytes
- Clade: Angiosperms
- Clade: Eudicots
- Clade: Rosids
- Order: Brassicales
- Family: Brassicaceae
- Genus: Iberis
- Species: I. amara

Binomial name
- Iberis amara L.

Synonyms
- List: Biauricula amara (L.) Bubani; Biauricula panduriformis Bubani; Biauricula resedifolia (Pourr. ex Timb.-Lagr.) Bubani; Crucifera iberis E.H.L.Krause; Iberis affinis Jord.; Iberis apricorum Giraudias; Iberis arvatica Jord.; Iberis bicolor Rchb.; Iberis bicorymbifera Gren. & Godr.; Iberis ciliata subsp. vinetorum (Pau) Mateo & M.B.Crespo; Iberis contracta subsp. vinetorum (Pau) M.B.Crespo & Mateo; Iberis crenata Lam.; Iberis decipiens Jord.; Iberis forestieri Jord.; Iberis linifolia var. vinetorum (Pau) O.Bolòs & Vigo; Iberis liviensis Sennen; Iberis lusitanica Fisch., C.A.Mey. & Avé-Lall.; Iberis martini Timb.-Lagr.; Iberis montolivensis Timb.-Lagr.; Iberis panduriformis Pourr.; Iberis pinetorum Pau; Iberis sabauda Puget; Iberis serotina Sennen; Iberis vinetorum Pau; Thlaspi amarum (L.) Crantz

= Iberis amara =

Species of flowering plant

Iberis amara, called wild candytuft, rocket candytuft and bitter candytuft, is a species of flowering plant in the family Brassicaceae, native to Belgium, France, Germany, Great Britain, Italy, Spain, and Switzerland. It has been introduced to numerous locations including Algeria, Sweden, Eastern Europe, the Caucasus, Iraq, Kazakhstan, the Indian Subcontinent, Korea, Far Eastern Russia, New Zealand, Argentina, Ecuador, Hispaniola, the United States, and Canada. It prefers to grow in warm and sunny conditions, in high-calcium soil.

== Description ==
I. amara is a branched erect annual typically 10–30 cm (4–12 in) tall, sometimes reaching 40 cm (16 in). Its stems are more or less hairy below and glabrous above, with leaves scattered along their lengths. Leaf blades are simple, with those lower on the stem spathulate and reaching about 8 cm (3 in) long and 1.2 cm (0.5 in) wide, and those higher up lanceolate or oblong‑cuneate and as small as 3 cm (1.2 in) long and 0.4 cm (0.2 in) wide. All are more or less sparsely dentate towards their apices.

The ebracteate inflorescence is a lax racemose corymb, bearing 10 to 30 flowers, and elongating to 10 cm (4 in) when in fruit. Individual flowers are about 1 cm (0.4 in) across, borne on a filiform pedicel, which is either spreading or ascending, and about 1 cm (0.4 in) long. There are four petals, which in wild‑type individuals are white or pale violet, with cultivated varieties available in deeper shades of pink, violet or fuchsia.

The petals are prominently unequal, with the outer two nearly twice as long as the sepals. This is controlled by the timing of the expression of the IaTCP1 gene (a member of the TCP protein domain family), which induces extra cell proliferation in the two larger petals, which are 5–8 mm (0.2–0.3 in) 10 mm (0.4 in) long, obovate-oblong, and cuneate beneath.

The suborbicular siliculae (fruit) are typically 5 mm (0.2 in), reaching 7 mm (0.3 in) in diameter, with deeply notched apices, and wings which widen somewhat towards the top. The styles are as long as or slightly exceed the apical notch, with valves that have reticulate veins. The reddish-brown seeds are about 3 mm (0.1 in) long, broadly ovate, and weakly winged beneath.

Iberis amara contains flavonoids such as catechin, kaempferol, quercetin, and rutin, that can be extracted by using supercritical fluid extraction method.
