= PCNA-associated factor =

Protein-coding gene in the species Homo sapiens

PCLAF

Identifiers
- Aliases: PCLAF, L5, NS5ATP9, OEATC, OEATC-1, OEATC1, PAF, PAF15, p15(PAF), p15/PAF, p15PAF, KIAA0101, PCNA clamp associated factor
- External IDs: OMIM: 610696; MGI: 1915276; GeneCards: PCLAF
Available structures
PDB	Ortholog search: PDBe RCSB
PDB	List of PDB id codes 4D2G

Gene location (Human)
Chr.	Chromosome 15 (human)
Band	15q22.31	Start	64,364,304 bp
Band	15q22.31	End	64,387,687 bp

Gene location (Mouse)
Chr.	Chromosome 9 (mouse)
Band	9|9 C	Start	65,797,519 bp
Band	9|9 C	End	65,810,548 bp
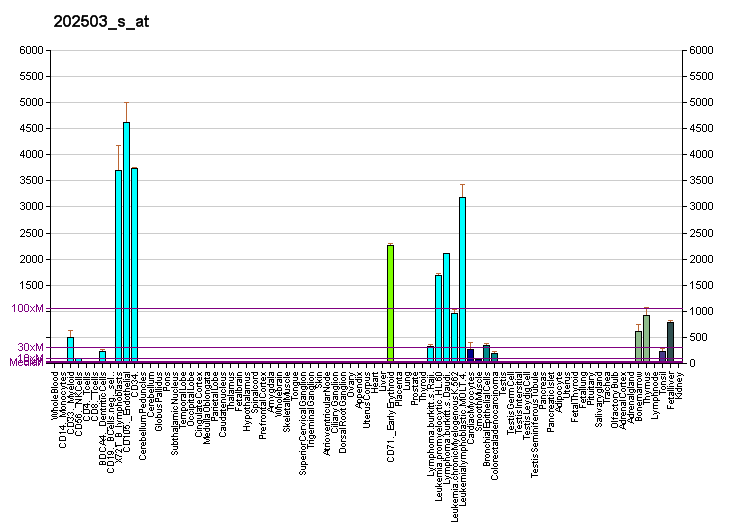

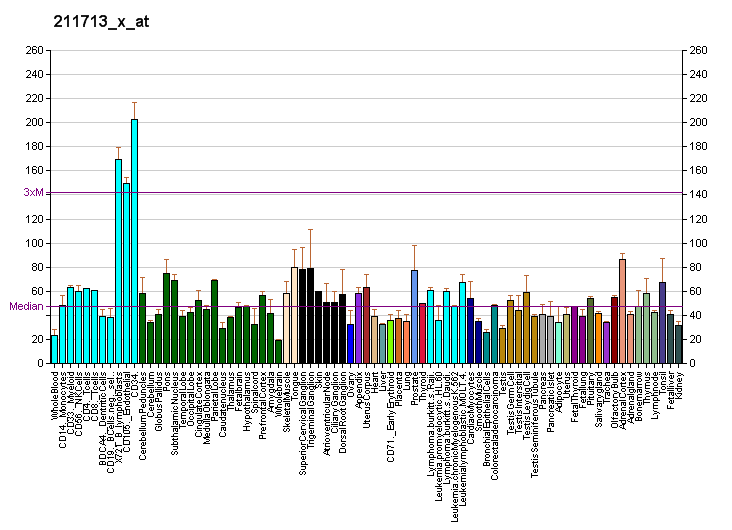
RNA expression pattern
Bgee	Human / Mouse (ortholog); Top expressed in: trabecular bone; embryo; ventricular zone; ganglionic eminence; bone marrow; gingival epithelium; thymus; hair follicle; bone marrow cell; oral cavity / Top expressed in: yolk sac; tail of embryo; somite; embryo; ventricular zone; genital tubercle; embryo; maxillary prominence; mandibular prominence; atrium; More reference expression data
BioGPS	More reference expression data
Gene ontology
Molecular function	chromatin binding; protein binding
Cellular component	perinuclear region of cytoplasm; nucleus; nucleoplasm; cytoplasm; centrosome
Biological process	DNA replication; translesion synthesis; response to UV; cellular response to DNA damage stimulus; regulation of cell cycle; DNA repair; centrosome cycle
Sources:Amigo / QuickGO
Orthologs
Databases	NCBI: entry; OMA: entry
Species	Human	Mouse
Entrez	9768	68026
Ensembl	ENSG00000166803	ENSMUSG00000040204
UniProt	Q15004	Q9CQX4
RefSeq (mRNA)	NM_001029989; NM_014736	NM_026515
RefSeq (protein)	NP_001025160; NP_055551	NP_080791
Location (UCSC)	Chr 15: 64.36 – 64.39 Mb	Chr 9: 65.8 – 65.81 Mb
PubMed search
- Wikidata
View/Edit Human	View/Edit Mouse

PCNA-associated factor (also called “PCNA clamp associated factor”) is a protein that in humans is encoded by the PCLAF gene (previously KIAA0101). The PCLAF protein binds to PCNA and regulates DNA repair during DNA replication.

== Interactions ==
PCLAF has been shown to interact with PCNA.
