= KCTD13 =

Protein-coding gene in the species Homo sapiens

Identifiers
- Aliases: KCTD13, BACURD1, PDIP1, POLDIP1, hBACURD1, FKSG86, potassium channel tetramerization domain containing 13
- External IDs: OMIM: 608947; MGI: 1923739; GeneCards: KCTD13
Available structures
PDB	Ortholog search: PDBe RCSB
PDB	List of PDB id codes 4UIJ

Gene location (Human)
Chr.	Chromosome 16 (human)
Band	16p11.2	Start	29,905,012 bp
Band	16p11.2	End	29,926,236 bp

Gene location (Mouse)
Chr.	Chromosome 7 (mouse)
Band	7|7 F3	Start	126,528,051 bp
Band	7|7 F3	End	126,544,803 bp
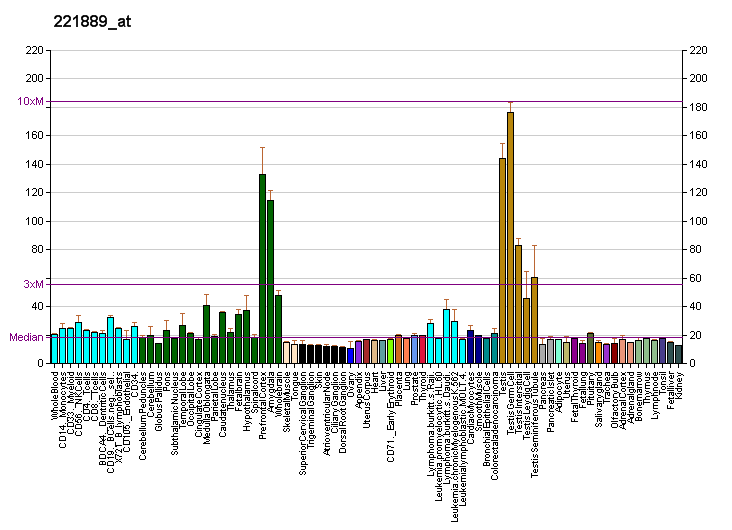

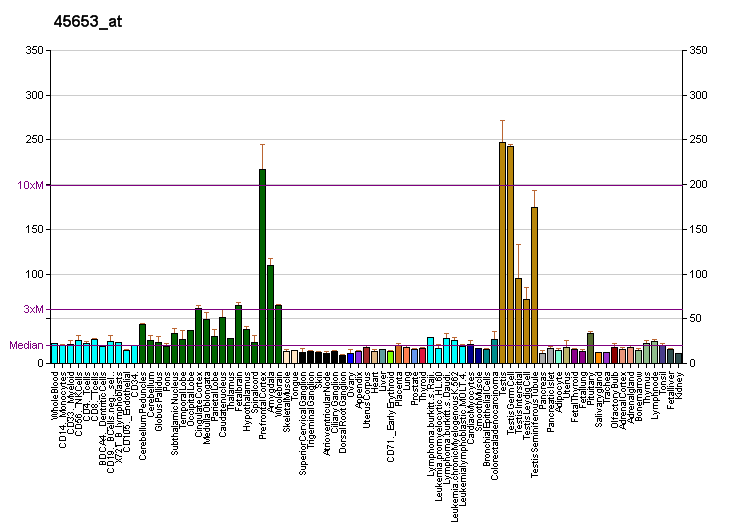
RNA expression pattern
Bgee	Human / Mouse (ortholog); Top expressed in: right testis; left testis; nucleus accumbens; anterior cingulate cortex; right frontal lobe; prefrontal cortex; amygdala; Region I of hippocampus proper; caudate nucleus; right hemisphere of cerebellum / Top expressed in: primary visual cortex; superior frontal gyrus; subiculum; zygote; dentate gyrus; dentate gyrus of hippocampal formation granule cell; piriform cortex; globus pallidus; cingulate gyrus; hippocampus proper; More reference expression data
BioGPS	More reference expression data
Gene ontology
Molecular function	ubiquitin-protein transferase activity; protein binding; identical protein binding; protein domain specific binding
Cellular component	Cul3-RING ubiquitin ligase complex; nucleus; nuclear body
Biological process	positive regulation of DNA replication; DNA replication; protein homooligomerization; cell migration; protein ubiquitination; stress fiber assembly; proteasome-mediated ubiquitin-dependent protein catabolic process; negative regulation of Rho protein signal transduction; positive regulation of synaptic transmission; neural precursor cell proliferation
Sources:Amigo / QuickGO
Orthologs
Databases	NCBI: entry; OMA: entry
Species	Human	Mouse
Entrez	253980	233877
Ensembl	ENSG00000174943	ENSMUSG00000030685
UniProt	Q8WZ19	Q8BGV7
RefSeq (mRNA)	NM_178863	NM_172747
RefSeq (protein)	NP_849194	NP_766335
Location (UCSC)	Chr 16: 29.91 – 29.93 Mb	Chr 7: 126.53 – 126.54 Mb
PubMed search
- Wikidata
View/Edit Human	View/Edit Mouse

BTB/POZ domain-containing protein KCTD13 is a protein that in humans is encoded by the KCTD13 gene.

== Interactions ==
KCTD13 has been shown to interact with PCNA.

== Clinical relevance ==
Mutations in this gene have been associated to abnormalities in brain growth and behaviour.
