= AOH1996 =

Experimental drug for treating cancer

Identifiers
- IUPAC name: N-[2-[2-(3-methoxyphenoxy)anilino]-2-oxoethyl]naphthalene-1-carboxamide
- CAS Number: 2089314-64-5
- PubChem CID: 126718388
- ChemSpider: 128921245
- UNII: EZ94L3M5SX
- ChEBI: CHEBI:195529

Chemical and physical data
- Formula: C_{26}H_{22}N_{2}O_{4}
- Molar mass: 426.472 g·mol^{−1}
- 3D model (JSmol): Interactive image
- SMILES: COC1=CC(=CC=C1)OC2=CC=CC=C2NC(=O)CNC(=O)C3=CC=CC4=CC=CC=C43
- InChI: InChI=1S/C26H22N2O4/c1-31-19-10-7-11-20(16-19)32-24-15-5-4-14-23(24)28-25(29)17-27-26(30)22-13-6-9-18-8-2-3-12-21(18)22/h2-16H,17H2,1H3,(H,27,30)(H,28,29); Key:HDMONPHKMIZXDH-UHFFFAOYSA-N

AOH1996 is an experimental anticancer medication which acts as a small molecule inhibitor of proliferating cell nuclear antigen (PCNA) and is in Phase I clinical trials at City of Hope as of August 2023 for the treatment of solid tumors.

AOH1996 was created to target a post-translationally modified isoform of PCNA, termed caPCNA, which is preferentially found in cancer cells. PCNA is crucial in the body for DNA repair, but targeting it is difficult because of its role in healthy cells. By selectively targeting caPCNA, it may be possible to kill cancer cells without affecting healthy tissues. In vitro testing demonstrated that AOH1996 inhibited the growth and induced cell cycle arrest and apoptotic cell death in a wide variety of cancer cell lines, but had no effect on several normal, nonmalignant cell types. In mouse and dog animal models, there were no observed side effects or toxicity even at six times the effective dose. It could be used either as a monotherapy (single drug regimen) or in combination with one or more other chemotherapy drugs.

Although the press described it as a "miracle drug" that would cure cancer, some experts have expressed skepticism. Prof Dorothy Bennett, Director of the Molecular and Clinical Sciences Research Institute, St George’s, University of London, critiqued the paper's cancer killing claim as actually a modest slowing of growth but, "there appears to be broad evidence here.... suggesting that this kind of approach deserves further development.”

The substance was named after the initials and the birth year of Anna Olivia Healey, who died of neuroblastoma in 2006. The funds collected by her parents have helped support the development of the chemical compound.
