= POLDIP2 =

Protein-coding gene in the species Homo sapiens

Identifiers
- Aliases: POLDIP2, PDIP38, POLD4, p38, polymerase (DNA) delta interacting protein 2, DNA polymerase delta interacting protein 2
- External IDs: OMIM: 611519; MGI: 1915061; GeneCards: POLDIP2

Gene location (Human)
Chr.	Chromosome 17 (human)
Band	17q11.2	Start	28,346,633 bp
Band	17q11.2	End	28,357,527 bp

Gene location (Mouse)
Chr.	Chromosome 11 (mouse)
Band	11|11 B5	Start	78,403,019 bp
Band	11|11 B5	End	78,413,562 bp
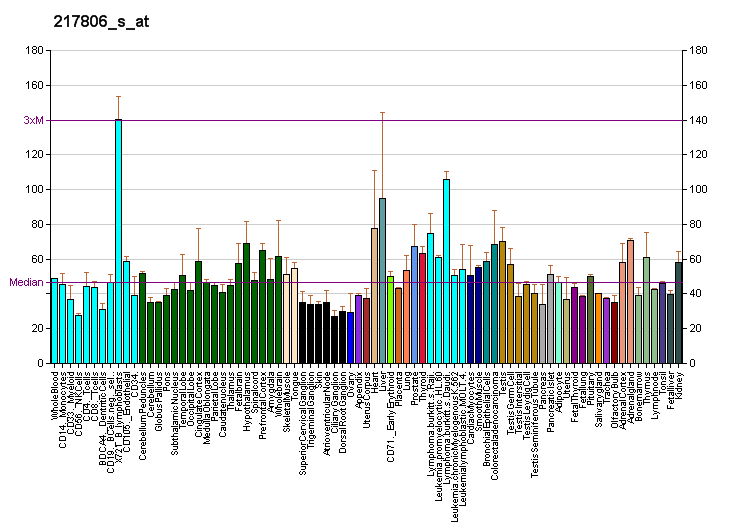
RNA expression pattern
Bgee	Human / Mouse (ortholog); Top expressed in: gastrocnemius muscle; muscle of thigh; right adrenal gland; right adrenal cortex; left adrenal gland; apex of heart; left adrenal cortex; right lobe of liver; left ventricle; right auricle of heart / Top expressed in: spermatocyte; spermatid; right kidney; brown adipose tissue; muscle of thigh; vastus lateralis muscle; proximal tubule; tibialis anterior muscle; ventricular zone; triceps brachii muscle; More reference expression data
BioGPS	More reference expression data
Gene ontology
Molecular function	DNA binding; protein binding
Cellular component	mitochondrial nucleoid; mitochondrion; nucleus
Biological process	mitochondrion morphogenesis; negative regulation of macroautophagy; positive regulation of mitotic cell cycle
Sources:Amigo / QuickGO
Orthologs
Databases	NCBI: entry; OMA: entry
Species	Human	Mouse
Entrez	26073	67811
Ensembl	ENSG00000004142	ENSMUSG00000001100
UniProt	Q9Y2S7	Q91VA6
RefSeq (mRNA)	NM_015584; NM_001290145	NM_026389
RefSeq (protein)	NP_001277074; NP_056399	NP_080665
Location (UCSC)	Chr 17: 28.35 – 28.36 Mb	Chr 11: 78.4 – 78.41 Mb
PubMed search
- Wikidata
View/Edit Human	View/Edit Mouse

Polymerase delta-interacting protein 2 also known as Polymerase delta-interacting protein of 38 kDa (PDIP38) is encoded by the POLDIP2 gene in humans.

This gene encodes a protein that interacts with the DNA polymerase delta p50 subunit. The encoded protein also interacts with proliferating cell nuclear antigen. Some transcripts of this gene overlap in a tail-to-tail orientation with the gene for tumor necrosis factor, alpha-induced protein 1 (TNFAIP1). POLDIP2 / PDIP38 is a moonlighting protein that has been identified in both the nucleus and the mitochondrion

== Interactions ==
In the nucleus, POLDIP2 has been shown to interact with PCNA, while in the mitochondrion POLDIP2 has been shown to interact with proteins constituting the mitochondrial DNA nucleoid and the AAA+ protease CLPXP where it modulates both the specificity and stability of this proteolytic machine.
