= RFC4 =

Protein-coding gene in the species Homo sapiens

Identifiers
- Aliases: RFC4, A1, RFC37, replication factor C subunit 4
- External IDs: OMIM: 102577; MGI: 2146571; GeneCards: RFC4

Gene location (Human)
Chr.	Chromosome 3 (human)
Band	3q27.3	Start	186,789,880 bp
Band	3q27.3	End	186,807,058 bp

Gene location (Mouse)
Chr.	Chromosome 16 (mouse)
Band	16|16 B1	Start	22,932,693 bp
Band	16|16 B1	End	22,946,487 bp
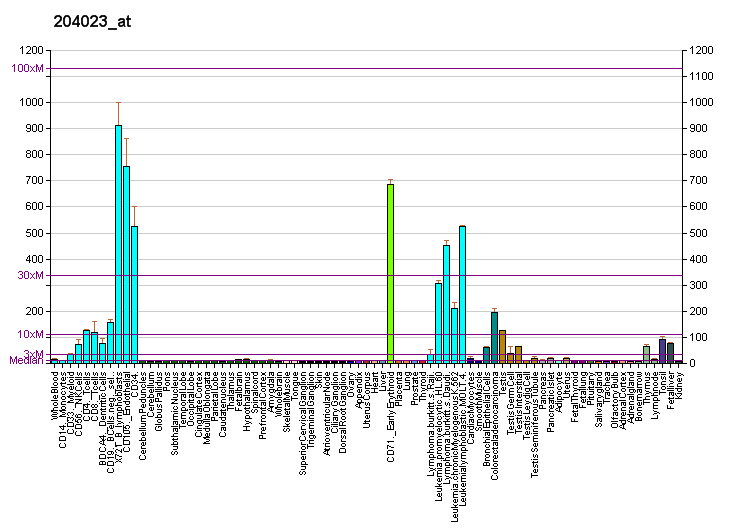
RNA expression pattern
Bgee	Human / Mouse (ortholog); Top expressed in: ventricular zone; ganglionic eminence; gonad; rectum; testicle; cerebellar hemisphere; bone marrow; right hemisphere of cerebellum; mucosa of transverse colon; appendix / Top expressed in: medial ganglionic eminence; maxillary prominence; mandibular prominence; otic placode; Gonadal ridge; abdominal wall; otic vesicle; fetal liver hematopoietic progenitor cell; endocardial cushion; Paneth cell; More reference expression data
BioGPS	More reference expression data
Gene ontology
Molecular function	nucleotide binding; DNA binding; single-stranded DNA helicase activity; protein binding; enzyme binding; ATP binding; DNA clamp loader activity
Cellular component	DNA replication factor C complex; Ctf18 RFC-like complex; nucleus; nucleoplasm; Elg1 RFC-like complex
Biological process	nucleotide-excision repair, DNA gap filling; error-free translesion synthesis; DNA strand elongation involved in DNA replication; error-prone translesion synthesis; DNA replication; positive regulation of DNA-directed DNA polymerase activity; translesion synthesis; transcription-coupled nucleotide-excision repair; nucleotide-excision repair, DNA incision; nucleotide-excision repair, DNA incision, 5'-to lesion; DNA repair; telomere maintenance via semi-conservative replication; DNA-dependent DNA replication; regulation of signal transduction by p53 class mediator
Sources:Amigo / QuickGO
Orthologs
Databases	NCBI: entry; OMA: entry
Species	Human	Mouse
Entrez	5984	106344
Ensembl	ENSG00000163918	ENSMUSG00000022881
UniProt	P35249	Q99J62
RefSeq (mRNA)	NM_181573; NM_002916	NM_145480
RefSeq (protein)	NP_002907; NP_853551	NP_663455
Location (UCSC)	Chr 3: 186.79 – 186.81 Mb	Chr 16: 22.93 – 22.95 Mb
PubMed search
- Wikidata
View/Edit Human	View/Edit Mouse

Replication factor C subunit 4 is a protein that in humans is encoded by the RFC4 gene.

== Function ==
The elongation of primed DNA templates by DNA polymerase delta and DNA polymerase epsilon requires the accessory proteins proliferating cell nuclear antigen (PCNA) and replication factor C (RFC). RFC, also named activator 1, is a protein complex consisting of five distinct subunits of 140, 40, 38, 37, and 36 kD. This gene encodes the 37 kD subunit. This subunit forms a core complex with the 36 and 40 kDa subunits. The core complex possesses DNA-dependent ATPase activity, which was found to be stimulated by PCNA in an in vitro system. Alternatively spliced transcript variants encoding the same protein have been reported.

Radioresistance of esophageal squamous carcinoma cells is a critical factor leading to treatment failure and recurrence. RFC4 expression is significantly upregulated in esophageal squamous carcinoma cell tissues and cells, particularly in cases that are radioresistant. RFC4 plays a role in conferring radioresistance to esophageal squamous cell carcinoma by bolstering repair of DNA damage. Thus RFC4 is a promising therapeutic target for combating radioresistance in esophageal squamous cell carcinoma.

== Interactions ==
RFC4 has been shown to interact with:

- BRD4,
- CHTF18,
- PCNA,
- RFC2,
- RFC3, and
- RFC5.
