= RFC5 =

Protein-coding gene in the species Homo sapiens

Identifiers
- Aliases: RFC5, RFC36, replication factor C subunit 5
- External IDs: OMIM: 600407; MGI: 1919401; GeneCards: RFC5
Available structures
PDB	Ortholog search: PDBe RCSB
PDB	List of PDB id codes 1LFS

Gene location (Human)
Chr.	Chromosome 12 (human)
Band	12q24.23	Start	118,013,588 bp
Band	12q24.23	End	118,033,130 bp

Gene location (Mouse)
Chr.	Chromosome 5 (mouse)
Band	5|5 F	Start	117,516,168 bp
Band	5|5 F	End	117,527,112 bp
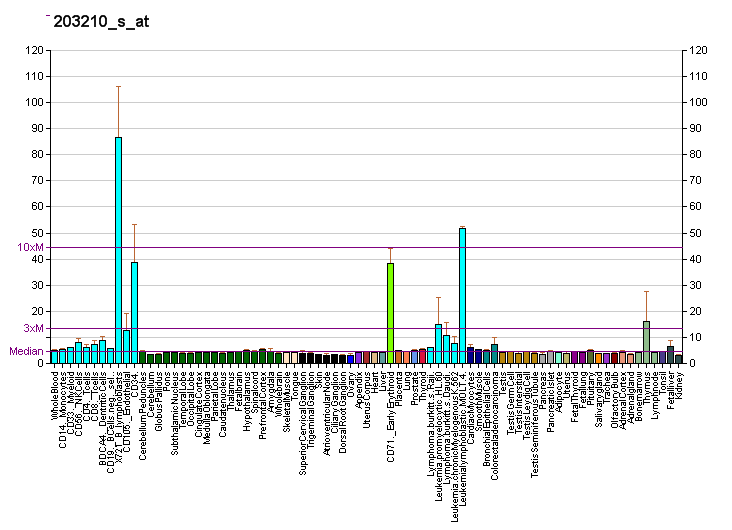

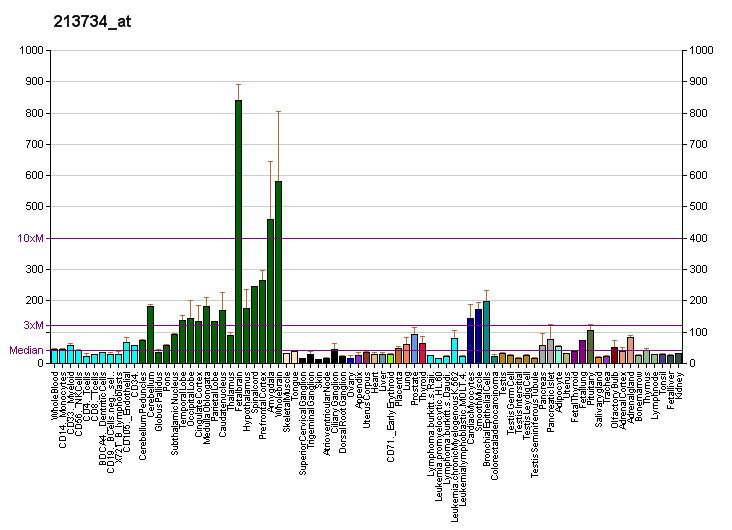

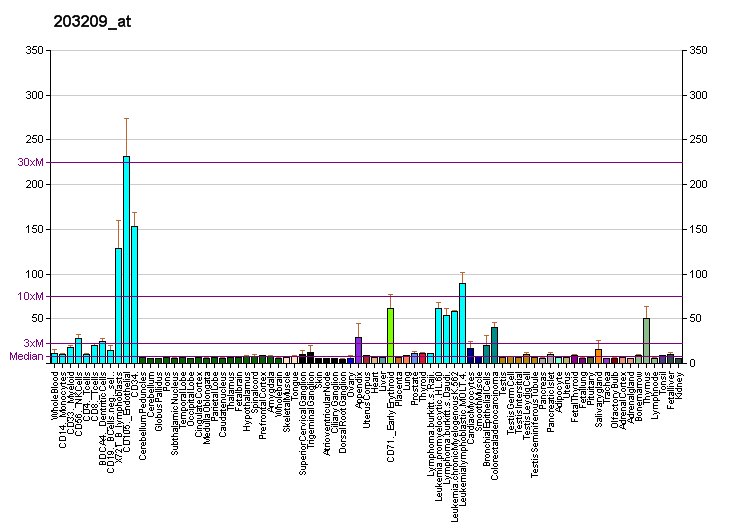
RNA expression pattern
Bgee	Human / Mouse (ortholog); Top expressed in: pons; superior vestibular nucleus; body of tongue; internal globus pallidus; Skeletal muscle tissue of biceps brachii; endothelial cell; inferior ganglion of vagus nerve; Brodmann area 23; subthalamic nucleus; right ventricle / Top expressed in: epiblast; embryo; bone marrow; embryo; yolk sac; thymus; ventricular zone; tail of embryo; neural tube; mesencephalon; More reference expression data
BioGPS	More reference expression data
Gene ontology
Molecular function	nucleotide binding; DNA binding; single-stranded DNA helicase activity; protein binding; ATP binding; enzyme binding; DNA clamp loader activity
Cellular component	DNA replication factor C complex; Ctf18 RFC-like complex; nucleoplasm; nucleus
Biological process	nucleotide-excision repair, DNA gap filling; error-free translesion synthesis; error-prone translesion synthesis; positive regulation of DNA-directed DNA polymerase activity; translesion synthesis; transcription-coupled nucleotide-excision repair; nucleotide-excision repair, DNA incision; nucleotide-excision repair, DNA incision, 5'-to lesion; DNA replication; DNA repair; telomere maintenance via semi-conservative replication; DNA-dependent DNA replication; regulation of signal transduction by p53 class mediator
Sources:Amigo / QuickGO
Orthologs
Databases	NCBI: entry; OMA: entry
Species	Human	Mouse
Entrez	5985	72151
Ensembl	ENSG00000111445	ENSMUSG00000029363
UniProt	P40937	Q9D0F6
RefSeq (mRNA)	NM_001130112; NM_001130113; NM_001206801; NM_007370; NM_181578 NM_001346815	NM_028128
RefSeq (protein)	NP_001123584; NP_001123585; NP_001193730; NP_001333744; NP_031396 NP_853556	NP_082404
Location (UCSC)	Chr 12: 118.01 – 118.03 Mb	Chr 5: 117.52 – 117.53 Mb
PubMed search
- Wikidata
View/Edit Human	View/Edit Mouse

Replication factor C subunit 5 is a protein that in humans is encoded by the RFC5 gene.

== Function ==
The elongation of primed DNA templates by DNA polymerase delta and DNA polymerase epsilon requires the accessory proteins proliferating cell nuclear antigen (PCNA) and replication factor C (RFC). RFC, also named activator 1, is a protein complex consisting of five distinct subunits of 140, 40, 38, 37, and 36 kD. This gene encodes the 36 kD subunit. This subunit can interact with the C-terminal region of PCNA. It forms a core complex with the 38 and 40 kDa subunits. The core complex possesses DNA-dependent ATPase activity, which was found to be stimulated by PCNA in an in vitro system. Alternatively spliced transcript variants encoding distinct isoforms have been reported.

== Interactions ==
RFC5 has been shown to interact with:

- BRD4,
- CHTF18,
- PCNA,
- RFC2, and
- RFC4.
