= POLE4 =

Protein-coding gene in the species Homo sapiens

Identifiers
- Aliases: POLE4, YHHQ1, p12, polymerase (DNA) epsilon 4, accessory subunit, DNA polymerase epsilon 4, accessory subunit
- External IDs: OMIM: 607269; MGI: 1914229; GeneCards: POLE4

Gene location (Human)
Chr.	Chromosome 2 (human)
Band	2p12	Start	74,958,643 bp
Band	2p12	End	74,970,128 bp

Gene location (Mouse)
Chr.	Chromosome 6 (mouse)
Band	6|6 C3	Start	82,595,973 bp
Band	6|6 C3	End	82,682,346 bp
RNA expression pattern
Bgee	Human / Mouse (ortholog); Top expressed in: granulocyte; cingulate gyrus; anterior cingulate cortex; mucosa of transverse colon; right adrenal cortex; popliteal artery; tibial arteries; monocyte; left adrenal gland; gastrocnemius muscle / Top expressed in: zygote; secondary oocyte; primary oocyte; yolk sac; retinal pigment epithelium; ciliary body; right kidney; ventricular zone; embryo; iris; More reference expression data
BioGPS	n/a
Gene ontology
Molecular function	transferase activity; DNA binding; DNA-directed DNA polymerase activity; nucleotidyltransferase activity; protein binding; protein heterodimerization activity
Cellular component	epsilon DNA polymerase complex; nucleus; nucleoplasm
Biological process	histone H3 acetylation; DNA biosynthetic process; G1/S transition of mitotic cell cycle; DNA replication initiation; telomere maintenance via semi-conservative replication
Sources:Amigo / QuickGO
Orthologs
Databases	NCBI: entry; OMA: entry
Species	Human	Mouse
Entrez	56655	66979
Ensembl	ENSG00000115350	ENSMUSG00000030042
UniProt	Q9NR33	Q9CQ36
RefSeq (mRNA)	NM_019896	NM_025882; NM_001370295
RefSeq (protein)	NP_063949	NP_080158; NP_001357224
Location (UCSC)	Chr 2: 74.96 – 74.97 Mb	Chr 6: 82.6 – 82.68 Mb
PubMed search
- Wikidata
View/Edit Human	View/Edit Mouse

Polymerase (DNA-directed), epsilon 4, accessory subunit is a protein that in humans is encoded by the POLE4 gene.

== Function ==
POLE4 is a histone-fold protein that interacts with other histone-fold proteins to bind DNA in a sequence-independent manner. These histone-fold protein dimers combine within larger enzymatic complexes for DNA transcription, replication, and packaging.
