= RFC2 =

Protein-coding gene in the species Homo sapiens

Identifiers
- Aliases: RFC2, RFC40, replication factor C subunit 2
- External IDs: OMIM: 600404; MGI: 1341868; GeneCards: RFC2

Gene location (Human)
| Chr. | Chromosome 7 (human) |
| Band | 7q11.23 | Start | 74,231,499 bp |
| Band | 7q11.23 | End | 74,254,458 bp |

Gene location (Mouse)
| Chr. | Chromosome 5 (mouse) |
| Band | 5 G2|5 74.68 cM | Start | 134,610,220 bp |
| Band | 5 G2|5 74.68 cM | End | 134,630,659 bp |
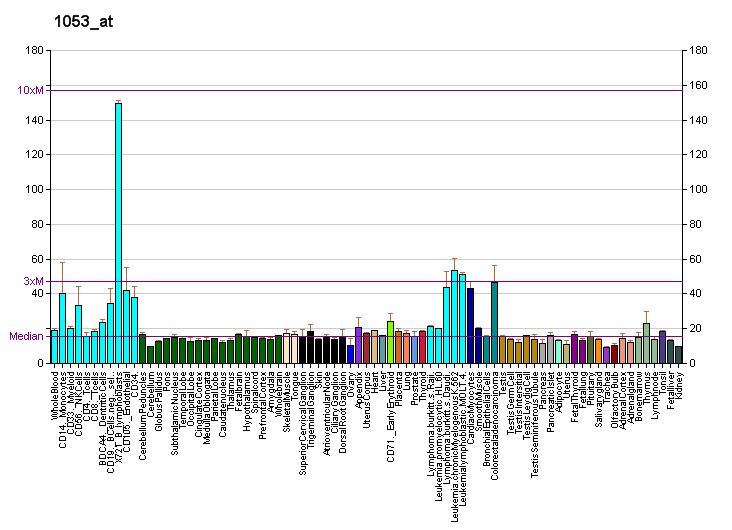

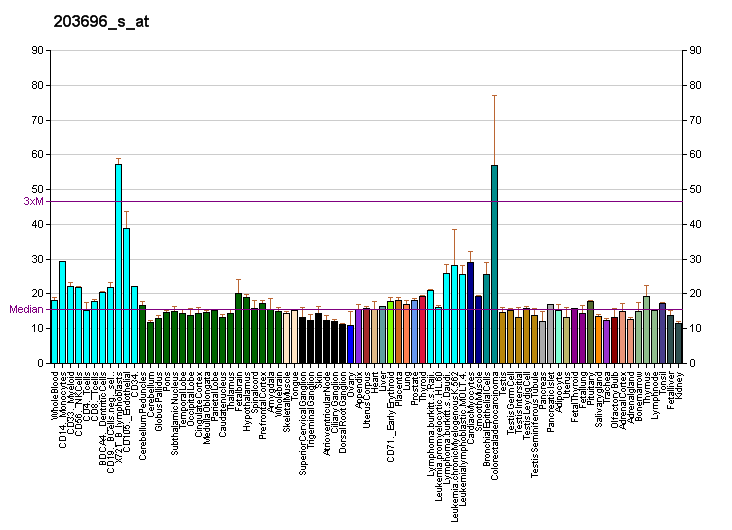
RNA expression pattern
| Bgee | Human / Mouse (ortholog); Top expressed in: ventricular zone; ganglionic eminence; gonad; monocyte; granulocyte; muscle of thigh; testicle; skin of leg; mucosa of transverse colon; skin of abdomen / Top expressed in: spermatid; spermatocyte; ventricular zone; seminiferous tubule; granulocyte; fetal liver hematopoietic progenitor cell; embryo; epiblast; abdominal wall; embryo; More reference expression data |
| BioGPS | More reference expression data |
Gene ontology
| Molecular function | nucleotide binding; DNA binding; single-stranded DNA helicase activity; protein binding; enzyme binding; ATP binding; DNA clamp loader activity |
| Cellular component | DNA replication factor C complex; Ctf18 RFC-like complex; nucleoplasm; nucleus |
| Biological process | nucleotide-excision repair, DNA gap filling; error-free translesion synthesis; error-prone translesion synthesis; DNA replication; positive regulation of DNA-directed DNA polymerase activity; translesion synthesis; transcription-coupled nucleotide-excision repair; nucleotide-excision repair, DNA incision; nucleotide-excision repair, DNA incision, 5'-to lesion; DNA repair; telomere maintenance via semi-conservative replication; DNA-dependent DNA replication; regulation of signal transduction by p53 class mediator |
Sources:Amigo / QuickGO
Orthologs
| Databases | NCBI: entry; OMA: entry |
| Species | Human | Mouse |
| Entrez | 5982 | 19718 |
| Ensembl | ENSG00000049541 | ENSMUSG00000023104 |
| UniProt | P35250; Q75MT5 | Q9WUK4 |
| RefSeq (mRNA) | NM_001278791; NM_001278792; NM_001278793; NM_002914; NM_181471 | NM_020022 |
| RefSeq (protein) | NP_001265720; NP_001265721; NP_001265722; NP_002905; NP_852136 NP_002905.2 | NP_064406 |
| Location (UCSC) | Chr 7: 74.23 – 74.25 Mb | Chr 5: 134.61 – 134.63 Mb |
| PubMed search |
- Wikidata
| View/Edit Human | View/Edit Mouse |

Replication factor C subunit 2 is a protein that in humans is encoded by the RFC2 gene.

== Function ==
The elongation of primed DNA templates by DNA polymerase delta and epsilon requires the action of the accessory proteins, proliferating cell nuclear antigen (PCNA) and replication factor C (RFC). RFC, also called activator 1, is a protein complex consisting of five distinct subunits of 145, 40, 38, 37, and 36.5 kD. This gene encodes the 40 kD subunit, which has been shown to be responsible for binding ATP. Deletion of this gene has been associated with Williams syndrome. Alternatively spliced transcript variants encoding distinct isoforms have been described.

== Interactions ==
RFC2 has been shown to interact with BRD4, CHTF18, PCNA, RFC4 and RFC5.
