= DCC1 =

Protein-coding gene in the species Homo sapiens

DSCC1

Identifiers
- Aliases: DSCC1, DCC1, DNA replication and sister chromatid cohesion 1
- External IDs: OMIM: 613203; MGI: 1919357; HomoloGene: 5464; GeneCards: DSCC1; OMA:DSCC1 - orthologs

Gene location (Human)
Chr.	Chromosome 8 (human)
Band	8q24.12	Start	119,833,976 bp
Band	8q24.12	End	119,855,894 bp

Gene location (Mouse)
Chr.	Chromosome 15 (mouse)
Band	15|15 D1	Start	54,939,495 bp
Band	15|15 D1	End	54,953,887 bp
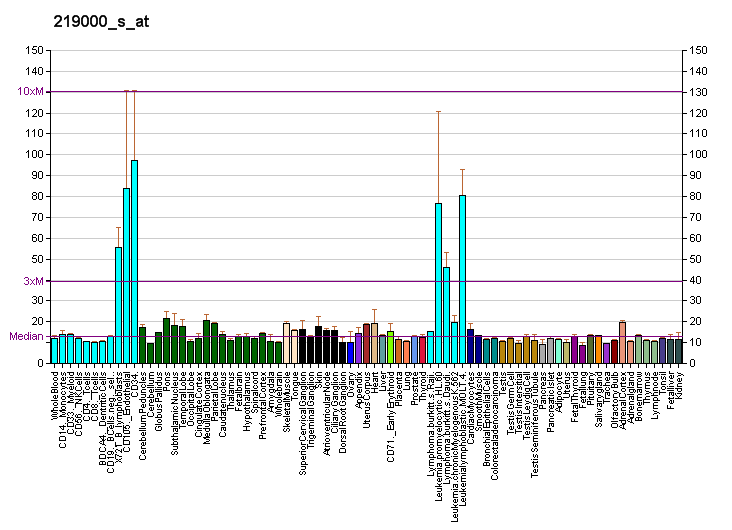
RNA expression pattern
Bgee	Human / Mouse (ortholog); Top expressed in: secondary oocyte; gonad; parotid gland; testicle; buccal mucosa cell; ventricular zone; embryo; ganglionic eminence; hair follicle; tendon of biceps brachii / Top expressed in: hand; ureter; otic vesicle; primary oocyte; endocardial cushion; abdominal wall; vas deferens; medial ganglionic eminence; seminiferous tubule; spermatid; More reference expression data
BioGPS	More reference expression data
Gene ontology
Molecular function	protein binding; single-stranded DNA helicase activity; DNA binding; DNA clamp loader activity
Cellular component	nucleoplasm; nucleus; chromosome, centromeric region; chromatin; Ctf18 RFC-like complex
Biological process	maintenance of mitotic sister chromatid cohesion; cell cycle; DNA replication; regulation of DNA replication; post-translational protein acetylation; positive regulation of DNA-directed DNA polymerase activity; mitotic sister chromatid cohesion
Sources:Amigo / QuickGO
Orthologs
Species	Human	Mouse
Entrez	79075	72107
Ensembl	ENSG00000136982	ENSMUSG00000022422
UniProt	Q9BVC3	Q14AI0
RefSeq (mRNA)	NM_024094	NM_183089; NM_001355594
RefSeq (protein)	NP_076999	NP_898912; NP_001342523
Location (UCSC)	Chr 8: 119.83 – 119.86 Mb	Chr 15: 54.94 – 54.95 Mb
PubMed search
- Wikidata
View/Edit Human	View/Edit Mouse

Sister chromatid cohesion protein DCC1 is a protein that in humans is encoded by the DSCC1 gene.

== Interactions ==
DCC1 has been shown to interact with CHTF18.
