= Shugoshin 2 =

Protein-coding gene in the species Homo sapiens

SGO2

Identifiers
- Aliases: SGO2, TRIPIN, SGOL2, shugoshin 2
- External IDs: OMIM: 612425; MGI: 1098767; GeneCards: SGO2

Gene location (Human)
Chr.	Chromosome 2 (human)
Band	2q33.1	Start	200,510,008 bp
Band	2q33.1	End	200,584,096 bp

Gene location (Mouse)
Chr.	Chromosome 1 (mouse)
Band	1 C1.3|1 28.86 cM	Start	58,035,130 bp
Band	1 C1.3|1 28.86 cM	End	58,065,058 bp
RNA expression pattern
Bgee	Human / Mouse (ortholog); Top expressed in: oocyte; secondary oocyte; sperm; ventricular zone; thymus; testicle; parietal pleura; gonad; ganglionic eminence; buccal mucosa cell / Top expressed in: genital tubercle; secondary oocyte; zygote; hand; spermatocyte; medial ganglionic eminence; tail of embryo; primary oocyte; atrioventricular valve; maxillary prominence; More reference expression data
BioGPS	n/a
Gene ontology
Molecular function	protein binding
Cellular component	chromosome; cytosol; chromosome, centromeric region; nucleus; kinetochore; mitotic cohesin complex; nucleoplasm; nuclear body
Biological process	cell division; chromosome segregation; cell cycle; meiotic sister chromatid cohesion, centromeric; meiosis
Sources:Amigo / QuickGO
Orthologs
Databases	NCBI: entry; OMA: entry
Species	Human	Mouse
Entrez	151246	68549
Ensembl	ENSG00000163535	ENSMUSG00000026039
UniProt	Q562F6	Q7TSY8
RefSeq (mRNA)	NM_001160033; NM_001160046; NM_152524	NM_001177867; NM_199007
RefSeq (protein)	NP_001153505; NP_001153518; NP_689737	NP_001171338; NP_950172
Location (UCSC)	Chr 2: 200.51 – 200.58 Mb	Chr 1: 58.04 – 58.07 Mb
PubMed search
- Wikidata
View/Edit Human	View/Edit Mouse

Shugoshin 2 (Shugoshin-2), also known as Shugoshin-like 2, is a protein which in humans is encoded by the SGO2 gene.

== Function ==
Shugoshin-2 is one of the two mammalian orthologs of the Shugoshin/Mei-S322 family of proteins that regulate sister chromatid cohesion by protecting the integrity of a multiprotein complex named cohesin. This protective system is essential for faithful chromosome segregation during mitosis and meiosis, which is the physical basis of Mendelian inheritance.
