= DNA polymerase epsilon =

Class of enzymes

DNA-directed DNA polymerase

Identifiers
- EC no.: 2.7.7.7
- CAS no.: 9012-90-2

Databases
- BRENDA: enzyme data
- ExPASy: NiceZyme view
- KEGG: enzyme entry
- MetaCyc: metabolic pathway
- Rhea: reactions
- PDB structures: RCSB PDB PDBe PDBsum
Search
- PMC: articles
- PubMed: articles
- NCBI: proteins

DNA polymerase epsilon is a member of the DNA polymerase family of enzymes found in eukaryotes. It is composed of the following four subunits: POLE (central catalytic unit), POLE2 (subunit 2), POLE3 (subunit 3), and POLE4 (subunit 4). Recent evidence suggests that it plays a major role in leading strand DNA synthesis and nucleotide and base excision repair.

Research had conducted to study nucleotide excision repair DNA synthesis by DNA polymerase epsilon in the presence of PCNA (proliferating cell nuclear antigen), RFC (replication factor C) and RPA (replication protein A). Either DNA polymerase epsilon or DNA polymerase delta along with DNA ligase can be used to repair UV-damaged DNA. However, it is found that DNA polymerase delta require the presence of both RFC and PCNA in order in DNA repair. In addition, it only produces small amount of fractionated DNA ligated products. DNA polymerase epsilon proves to be best suited for nucleotide excision repair. DNA polymerase epsilon is independent of both PCNA and RFC, and produces mostly ligated DNA products. It is also found that under one condition where DNA polymerase epsilon require PCNA and RFC: nucleotide excision repair in the presence of single strand binding protein RPA. PCNA and RFC function as anchor and direct DNA polymerase epsilon onto the DNA template.
