= RFC3 =

Protein-coding gene in the species Homo sapiens

Identifiers
- Aliases: RFC3, RFC38, replication factor C subunit 3
- External IDs: OMIM: 600405; MGI: 1916513; GeneCards: RFC3

Gene location (Human)
Chr.	Chromosome 13 (human)
Band	13q13.2	Start	33,818,069 bp
Band	13q13.2	End	33,966,558 bp

Gene location (Mouse)
Chr.	Chromosome 5 (mouse)
Band	5|5 G3	Start	151,566,221 bp
Band	5|5 G3	End	151,574,707 bp
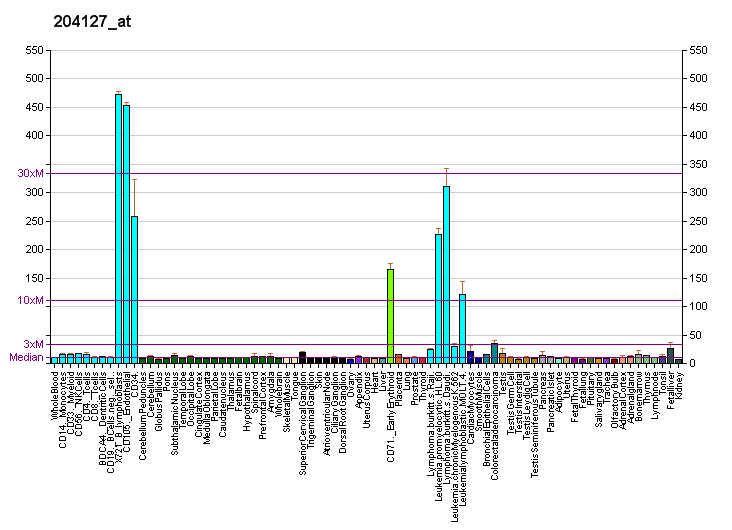

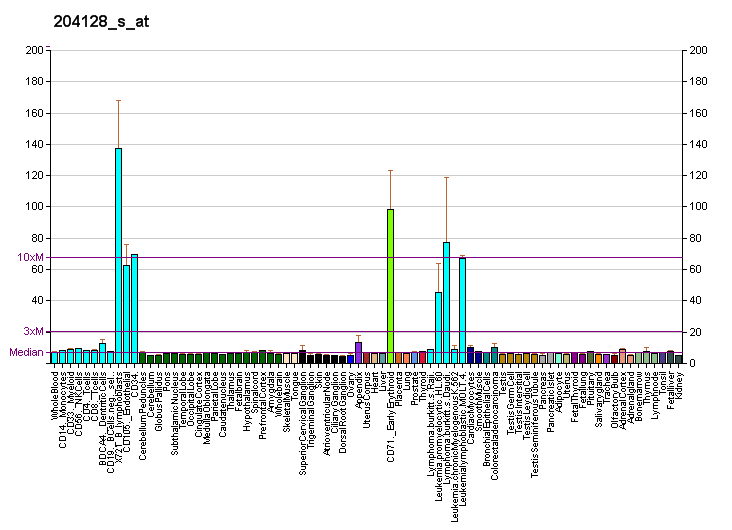
RNA expression pattern
Bgee	Human / Mouse (ortholog); Top expressed in: gonad; ventricular zone; embryo; ganglionic eminence; secondary oocyte; testicle; right adrenal cortex; left adrenal gland; left adrenal cortex; appendix / Top expressed in: medial ganglionic eminence; abdominal wall; maxillary prominence; mandibular prominence; embryo; embryo; epiblast; ventricular zone; otic placode; endocardial cushion; More reference expression data
BioGPS	More reference expression data
Gene ontology
Molecular function	single-stranded DNA helicase activity; ATPase activity; protein binding; DNA binding; DNA clamp loader activity
Cellular component	Ctf18 RFC-like complex; nucleoplasm; DNA replication factor C complex; nucleus
Biological process	nucleotide-excision repair, DNA gap filling; DNA synthesis involved in DNA repair; error-free translesion synthesis; DNA strand elongation involved in DNA replication; error-prone translesion synthesis; positive regulation of DNA-directed DNA polymerase activity; response to organophosphorus; translesion synthesis; transcription-coupled nucleotide-excision repair; nucleotide-excision repair, DNA incision; DNA replication; nucleotide-excision repair, DNA incision, 5'-to lesion; telomere maintenance via semi-conservative replication; DNA-dependent DNA replication; regulation of signal transduction by p53 class mediator
Sources:Amigo / QuickGO
Orthologs
Databases	NCBI: entry; OMA: entry
Species	Human	Mouse
Entrez	5983	69263
Ensembl	ENSG00000133119	ENSMUSG00000033970
UniProt	P40938	Q8R323
RefSeq (mRNA)	NM_002915; NM_181558	NM_027009
RefSeq (protein)	NP_002906; NP_853536	NP_081285
Location (UCSC)	Chr 13: 33.82 – 33.97 Mb	Chr 5: 151.57 – 151.57 Mb
PubMed search
- Wikidata
View/Edit Human	View/Edit Mouse

Replication factor C subunit 3 is a protein that in humans is encoded by the RFC3 gene.

== Function ==
The elongation of primed DNA templates by DNA polymerase delta and DNA polymerase epsilon requires the accessory proteins proliferating cell nuclear antigen (PCNA) and replication factor C (RFC). RFC, also named activator 1, is a protein complex consisting of five distinct subunits of 140, 40, 38, 37, and 36 kDa. This gene encodes the 38 kDa subunit. This subunit is essential for the interaction between the 140 kDa subunit and the core complex that consists of the 36, 37, and 40 kDa subunits. Alternatively spliced transcript variants encoding distinct isoforms have been described.

== Interactions ==
RFC3 has been shown to interact with:

- BRD4,
- CHTF18,
- PCNA,
- RFC1, and
- RFC4.
