= Replication factor C =

The replication factor C, or RFC, is a five-subunit protein complex that is required for DNA replication.

The subunits of this heteropentamer are named Rfc1, Rfc2, Rfc3, Rfc4, and Rfc5 in Saccharomyces cerevisiae. RFC is used in eukaryotic replication as a clamp loader, similar to the γ Complex in Escherichia coli. Its role as a clamp loader involves catalyzing the loading of PCNA onto DNA. It binds to the 3' end of the DNA and uses ATP to open the ring of PCNA so that it can encircle the DNA. ATP hydrolysis causes the release of RFC, with concomitant clamp loading onto DNA. For DNA polymerase, RFC serves as primer identification. RFC plays an important role in the proliferation, invasion, and progression of various malignant tumors. RFC acts as a tumor suppressor gene.

== RFC sub-units ==
The 5 subunits of replication factor C are

1. RFC1 (140KDa)
2. RFC2 (40KDa)
3. RFC3 (38KDa)
4. RFC4 (37KDa)
5. RFC5 (36KDa)

Eukaryotes, yeast, mice, drosophila, calf thymus, humans, rice, and Arabidopsis all contain 5 subunits. There are genes such as 13q12.3-q13, 3q27, and p140 (RFC1), p40 (RFC2), p38 (RFC3), p37 (RFC4), p36 (RFC5) that are located on human chromosomal segments. RFC Boxes (1–8) are the amino acid sequences found in human replication factor C. RFC 1 is the largest RFC subunit, with 8 RFC Boxes. Other RFC subunits have 7 RFC boxes. RFC box 1 has a 90 amino acid-long region, while RFC box 2 is a highly conserved subunit. RFC box 3 includes a phosphate-binding loop. RFC box 5 is the second most conserved box. RFC Box 6 is different between the two subunits such as one large 6a and small 6b subunits.

== Physiological functions of RFC in Humans ==
RFC is involved in the maintenance of telomeres, nuclear DNA replication, mismatch repair, and nucleotide excision repair. In the presence of ATP, RFC can load proliferating cell nuclear antigen (PCNA) and DNA polymerase to form DNA-RFC-PCNA-DNA polymerase, which elongates in the presence of deoxynucleotides (dNTPs) via the action of human single-stranded DNA-binding protein (HSSB). RFC acts as a DNA checkpoint, initiating repairs such as excisions and mismatch repair. RFC1 has a binding region that interacts with PCNA, which has been linked to Hutchinson-Gilford progeria syndrome (HGPS). RFC prevents cell death caused by histone H3K56. RFC2 can load PCNA into chromatin during DNA replication and it is also involved in DNA replication and repair, as well as cell cycle checkpoints.

== RFC as a checkpoint ==
To minimize somatic genetic alterations, checkpoint mechanisms stimulate a cell cycle halt at precise locations when DNA and perhaps other cellular constitutes are destroyed and sustain the arrested state till the signals clearly show the healing process from the injury is obtained. RFC5 and RCF2 are also engaged in DNA damage checkpoints and DNA replication checkpoints. Replication factor C is an emergency backup factor for DNA polymerases. RFC2 gene product required for a cell cycle checkpoint.

RFC is a heteropentamer in budding yeast, it is encoded either by RFC1 and RFC2-5 genes. For polymerases δ and ε, RFC is a primer recognition factor. During chromosomal DNA replication, the RFC2 gene product meets the RFC1 and RFC5 specific genes, in addition to both DNA polymerases δ and ɛ. The rfc3+ gene is completely separated from fission yeast for DNA damage to regulate checkpoints. The checkpoint signal is also established by RFC3. To regulate the G2-M transition RFC proteins appear to be important in signal transmission to the checkpoint machinery.
