= RFC1 =

Proteine

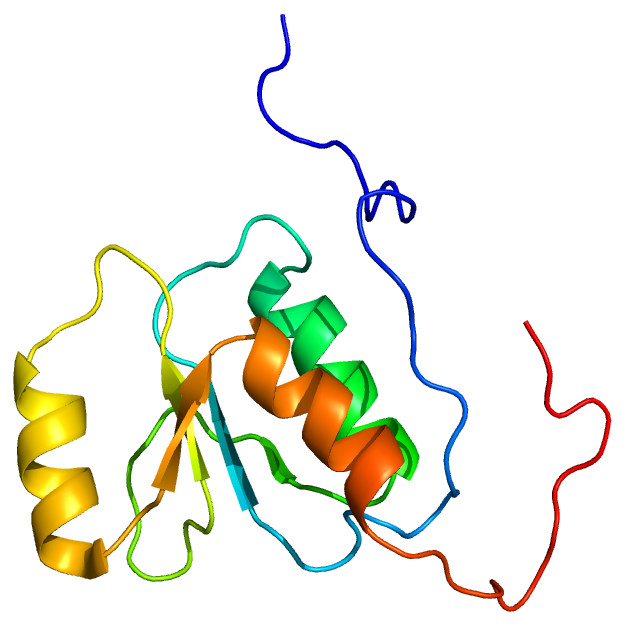

Identifiers
- Aliases: RFC1, RFC, replication factor C subunit 1, A1, PO-GA, RECC1, MHCBFB, RFC140, CANVAS
- External IDs: OMIM: 102579; MGI: 97891; GeneCards: RFC1
Available structures
PDB	Ortholog search: PDBe RCSB
PDB	List of PDB id codes 2EBU, 2K6G, 2K7F

Gene location (Human)
Chr.	Chromosome 4 (human)
Band	4p14	Start	39,287,456 bp
Band	4p14	End	39,366,375 bp

Gene location (Mouse)
Chr.	Chromosome 5 (mouse)
Band	5 C3.1|5 33.61 cM	Start	65,419,193 bp
Band	5 C3.1|5 33.61 cM	End	65,493,013 bp
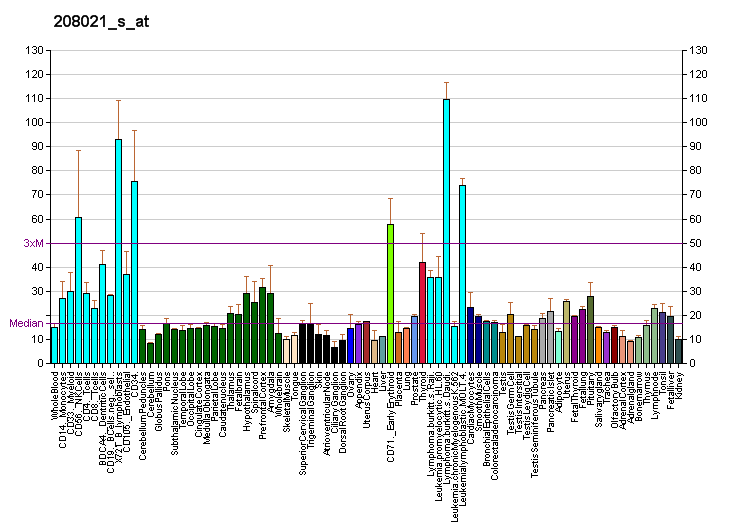

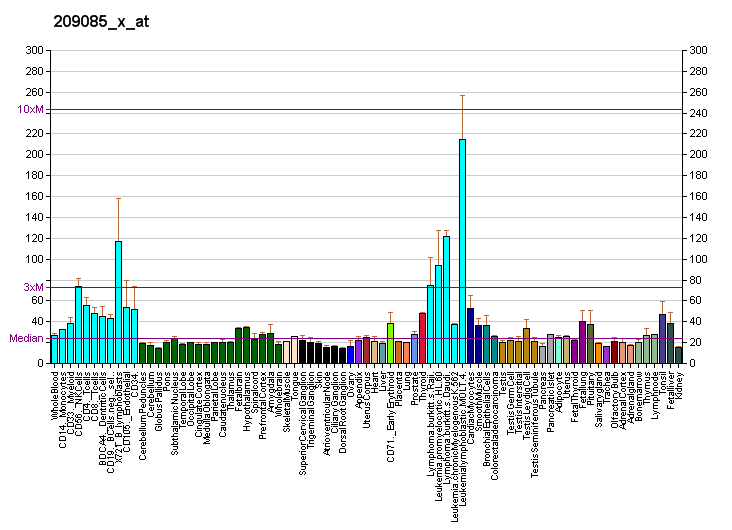
RNA expression pattern
Bgee	Human / Mouse (ortholog); Top expressed in: Achilles tendon; ventricular zone; sural nerve; body of pancreas; epithelium of colon; testicle; ganglionic eminence; bone marrow cell; right adrenal cortex; tonsil / Top expressed in: genital tubercle; tail of embryo; otic placode; primitive streak; otic vesicle; saccule; zygote; epiblast; cumulus cell; morula; More reference expression data
BioGPS	More reference expression data
Gene ontology
Molecular function	nucleotide binding; protein binding; enzyme activator activity; ATP binding; DNA clamp loader activity; DNA binding; sequence-specific DNA binding; double-stranded DNA binding; protein domain specific binding; DNA clamp unloader activity
Cellular component	nucleoplasm; extracellular exosome; DNA replication factor C complex; nucleus; nucleolus; cytoplasm; Elg1 RFC-like complex; protein-containing complex
Biological process	DNA-dependent DNA replication; nucleotide-excision repair, DNA gap filling; regulation of transcription, DNA-templated; telomere maintenance via telomerase; error-free translesion synthesis; transcription, DNA-templated; error-prone translesion synthesis; DNA replication; translesion synthesis; transcription-coupled nucleotide-excision repair; nucleotide-excision repair, DNA incision; DNA repair; nucleotide-excision repair, DNA incision, 5'-to lesion; positive regulation of catalytic activity; negative regulation of transcription by RNA polymerase II; negative regulation of transcription, DNA-templated; positive regulation of transcription, DNA-templated; telomere maintenance via semi-conservative replication; DNA clamp unloading
Sources:Amigo / QuickGO
Orthologs
Databases	NCBI: entry; OMA: entry
Species	Human	Mouse
Entrez	5981	19687
Ensembl	ENSG00000035928	ENSMUSG00000029191
UniProt	P35251	P35601
RefSeq (mRNA)	NM_001204747; NM_002913; NM_001363495; NM_001363496	NM_011258; NM_001347357; NM_001347358
RefSeq (protein)	NP_001191676; NP_002904; NP_001350424; NP_001350425	NP_001334286; NP_001334287; NP_035388
Location (UCSC)	Chr 4: 39.29 – 39.37 Mb	Chr 5: 65.42 – 65.49 Mb
PubMed search
- Wikidata
View/Edit Human	View/Edit Mouse

Replication factor C subunit 1 is a protein that in humans is encoded by the RFC1 gene.

== Function ==
The protein encoded by this gene is the large subunit of replication factor C, which is a five subunit DNA polymerase accessory protein. Replication factor C is a DNA-dependent ATPase that is required for eukaryotic DNA replication and repair. The protein acts as an activator of DNA polymerases, binds to the 3' end of primers, and promotes coordinated synthesis of both strands. It also may have a role in telomere stability.

== Interactions ==
RFC1 has been shown to interact with:

- BRD4,
- HDAC1,
- PCNA,
- RELA and
- RFC3.

== Clinical relevance ==
Biallelic intronic repeat expansions (a series of repeating nucleotide sequences) in the replication factor C subunit 1 (RFC1) gene causes cerebellar ataxia, neuropathy and vestibular areflexia syndrome (CANVAS). Within the poly(A) tail of an AluSx3 element in RFC1, there are eleven repeats of the pentanucleotide "AAAAG". Repeat expansion and polymorphic configuration are observed in part of the population, with increased number of repeats associated to alternative "AAAGG", "AAGGG" and "ACAGG" pentanucleotides. In particular, biallelic "AAGGG" and "ACAGG" repeat expansion have disproportionately been observed in patients with CANVAS. Biallelic "AAGGG" repeat expansion is also reported in a high number of sporadic cases of late-onset ataxia, isolate sensory neuropathy and, less frequently, isolate cerebellar ataxia. Due to a diagnostic overlap with CANVAS, researchers have also investigated the presence of RFC1 expansions in pathologically confirmed multiple system atrophy (MSA) but found a similar alteration frequency (0.7%) to a healthy population, suggesting RFC1 does not have a role in this disease.

Mutant biallelic intronic repeat expansions do not affect RFC1 expression in patient peripheral and brain tissue, suggesting no overt loss of function of this gene.

In patients with the pathogenic RFC1 expansion, sensory neuropathy appears to be a predominant feature and patients may also present with symptoms such as cerebellar dysfunction, vestibular involvement and a dry spasmodic cough therefore, genetic testing is recommended in those with these symptoms.
