= DNA-dependent ATPase =

Protein family

DNA-dependent ATPase, abbreviated Dda and also known as Dda helicase and Dda DNA helicase, is the 439-amino acid 49897 dalton protein coded by the Dda gene of the bacteriophage T4 phage, a virus that infects enterobacteria.

== Biochemistry ==
Dda is a molecular motor, specifically a helicase that moves in the 5' end to 3' direction along a nucleic acid phosphodiester backbone, separating two annealed nucleic acid strands, using the free energy released by the hydrolysis of adenosine triphosphate. The National Center for Biotechnology Information (NCBI) Reference Sequence accession number is NP_049632.

== Molecular biology ==
Dda is involved in the initiation of T4 DNA replication and DNA recombination.

== Genetics ==
The Dda gene is 31,219 base pair long. The GenBank accession number is AAD42555. The coding strand (see also: sense strand) begins in base number 9,410 and ends in base number 10,729.

== Cellular biology ==
Dda is toxic to cells at elevated levels.

== See also ==
- Enzymes
- Motor proteins
- Transcription (genetics)
