= CHTF18 =

Protein-coding gene in humans

Identifiers
- Aliases: CHTF18, C16orf41, C321D2.2, C321D2.3, C321D2.4, CHL12, Ctf18, RUVBL, chromosome transmission fidelity factor 18
- External IDs: OMIM: 613201; MGI: 2384887; GeneCards: CHTF18

Gene location (Human)
Chr.	Chromosome 16 (human)
Band	16p13.3	Start	788,046 bp
Band	16p13.3	End	800,737 bp

Gene location (Mouse)
Chr.	Chromosome 17 (mouse)
Band	17|17 A3.3	Start	25,937,900 bp
Band	17|17 A3.3	End	25,946,393 bp
RNA expression pattern
Bgee	Human / Mouse (ortholog); Top expressed in: right testis; left testis; mucosa of transverse colon; right hemisphere of cerebellum; pancreatic ductal cell; gonad; sural nerve; ventricular zone; ganglionic eminence; granulocyte / Top expressed in: epiblast; yolk sac; internal carotid artery; external carotid artery; morula; embryo; blastocyst; embryo; ventricular zone; neural layer of retina; More reference expression data
BioGPS	n/a
Gene ontology
Molecular function	nucleotide binding; DNA binding; single-stranded DNA helicase activity; protein binding; ATP binding; DNA clamp loader activity
Cellular component	membrane; Ctf18 RFC-like complex; nucleus; nucleoplasm; cytosol
Biological process	DNA replication; cell cycle; positive regulation of DNA-directed DNA polymerase activity
Sources:Amigo / QuickGO
Orthologs
Databases	NCBI: entry; OMA: entry
Species	Human	Mouse
Entrez	63922	214901
Ensembl	ENSG00000127586	ENSMUSG00000019214
UniProt	Q8WVB6	Q8BIW9
RefSeq (mRNA)	NM_022092	NM_145409
RefSeq (protein)	NP_071375	NP_663384
Location (UCSC)	Chr 16: 0.79 – 0.8 Mb	Chr 17: 25.94 – 25.95 Mb
PubMed search
- Wikidata
View/Edit Human	View/Edit Mouse

Chromosome transmission fidelity protein 18 homolog is a protein that in humans is encoded by the CHTF18 gene.

== Interactions ==
CHTF18 has been shown to interact with:

- DCC1,
- PCNA,
- RFC2,
- RFC3,
- RFC4, and
- RFC5.
