= STAG3 =

Protein-coding gene in the species Homo sapiens

Identifiers
- Aliases: STAG3, stromal antigen 3, SPGF61
- External IDs: OMIM: 608489; MGI: 1355311; GeneCards: STAG3

Gene location (Human)
Chr.	Chromosome 7 (human)
Band	7q22.1	Start	100,177,563 bp
Band	7q22.1	End	100,221,488 bp

Gene location (Mouse)
Chr.	Chromosome 5 (mouse)
Band	5 G2|5 77.01 cM	Start	138,278,502 bp
Band	5 G2|5 77.01 cM	End	138,310,655 bp
RNA expression pattern
Bgee	Human / Mouse (ortholog); Top expressed in: oocyte; right testis; left testis; secondary oocyte; right uterine tube; right hemisphere of cerebellum; C1 segment; gonad; gastrocnemius muscle; body of pancreas / Top expressed in: spermatocyte; spermatid; seminiferous tubule; Gonadal ridge; morula; embryo; blastocyst; zygote; embryo; granulocyte; More reference expression data
BioGPS	n/a
Gene ontology
Molecular function	chromatin binding; protein binding
Cellular component	synaptonemal complex; meiotic cohesin complex; chromosome, centromeric region; nucleus; chromosome; extracellular space; chromatin; cohesin complex
Biological process	cell cycle; meiosis; synaptonemal complex assembly; chromosome segregation; sister chromatid cohesion
Sources:Amigo / QuickGO
Orthologs
Databases	NCBI: entry; OMA: entry
Species	Human	Mouse
Entrez	10734	50878
Ensembl	ENSG00000066923	ENSMUSG00000036928
UniProt	Q9UJ98	O70576
RefSeq (mRNA)	NM_001282716; NM_001282717; NM_001282718; NM_012447; NM_001375438	NM_016964
RefSeq (protein)	NP_001269645; NP_001269646; NP_001269647; NP_036579; NP_001362367	NP_058660
Location (UCSC)	Chr 7: 100.18 – 100.22 Mb	Chr 5: 138.28 – 138.31 Mb
PubMed search
- Wikidata
View/Edit Human	View/Edit Mouse

Stromal antigen 3 is a protein that in humans is encoded by the STAG3 gene. STAG3 protein is a component of a cohesin complex that regulates the separation of sister chromatids specifically during meiosis. STAG3 appears to be paramount in sister-chromatid cohesion throughout the meiotic process in human oocytes and spermatocytes.

== Role in meiosis ==
STAG3 associates with several key structures throughout meiosis. As shown in spermatocytes, STAG3 interacts with the synaptonemal complex or SC, which facilitates the alignment of sister chromosomes. Furthermore, STAG3 associates with axial elements during prophase, which are responsible for packaging the sister chromosomes via loops. Once the axial elements interact with the SC they are termed as lateral elements. STAG3's involvement with these three complexes suggest its profound role in the cohesion of sister chromatids. Moreover, STAG3 has also been detected in the centromeres and telomeres of sister chromosomes, implying a potential role in telomere cohesion as well.

The role of STAG3 changes once prophase elapses. This is supported by the change in localization of STAG3 between metaphase and anaphase. STAG3 disassociates with the axes, but stays localized in the centromere, during the transition. Once anaphase is achieved, STAG3 is not observed anywhere in the chromosome architecture, further emphasizing its primary function in chromosome alignment and packaging.

== Animal studies ==
=== Aging ===
Deficiencies in STAG3 production can result in severe complications during meiosis. In the aging and age-related disease strain of mice, SAM, many cohesin proteins, including STAG3, are shown in reduced numbers. This supports the widely believed role of cohesin deficiency in aneuploidy as a result of aging.

=== Infertility ===
Infertility is a widely studied outcome of STAG3 deficiency or knockout. In a study, a homozygous knockout of STAG3 gene was made in a strain of mice. The males that had the double knockout had their testis reduced to half the size of the wild type mouse. Female mice also gonad atrophy. In STAG3 deficient female mice, body weight to ovary ratio dropped 10 fold compared to STAG +/- females. While all other cohesin subunits were able to assemble, the loss of STAG3 impaired the synapsis of sister chromosomes, as shortened or no axial elements and SCs were able to be formed, causing the spermatocytes and oocytes to forgo meiosis upon reaching prophase. In STAG3 knockout cells, the presence of other necessary proteins for synaptonemal complex formation, SMC1beta, RAD21L, and REC8, were found in decreased amounts.

A homozygous 1-bp deletion inducing a frameshift mutation in STAG3 causes premature ovarian failure. Loss of function mutations in STAG3 can result in stifling ovary development in utero. Much like the infertile STAG3 knockout male mice models, female mice also experienced meiotic arrest during prophase. Since females are born with a finite amount of oocytes, a significant deficiency in STAG3 can result in a depletion of viable eggs early in life.

In males, variants can result in azoospermia, or not motile sperm. To elaborate, a missense mutation, which resulted in a premature stop codon, leading to a complete loss of function in STAG3 caused infertility in men. Another mutation that has been identified changes a neutral amino acid residue, leucine, to a positively charged amino acid, arginine. This causes debilitating protein misfolding, preventing the protein from taking on the correct conformation, rendering it useless. It has been identified that variants in the STAG3 gene can be inherited in an autosomal recessive manner.

=== DNA damage repair ===
DNA damage repair pathways can also be disrupted by STAG3 depletion. In STAG3 mutants, DMC1 and RAD51, which are responsible for double stranded break invasion during crossing over events, aggregated after the double stranded breaks were supposed to be repaired. Given the lack of dissociation of RAD51 and DMC1, it is assumed that ATR and ATRIP function, which are responsible for double stranded break repair in recombination, is abnormal as result of STAG3 deficiency.
