= Proliferating cell nuclear antigen =

Mammalian protein found in Homo sapiens

PCNA
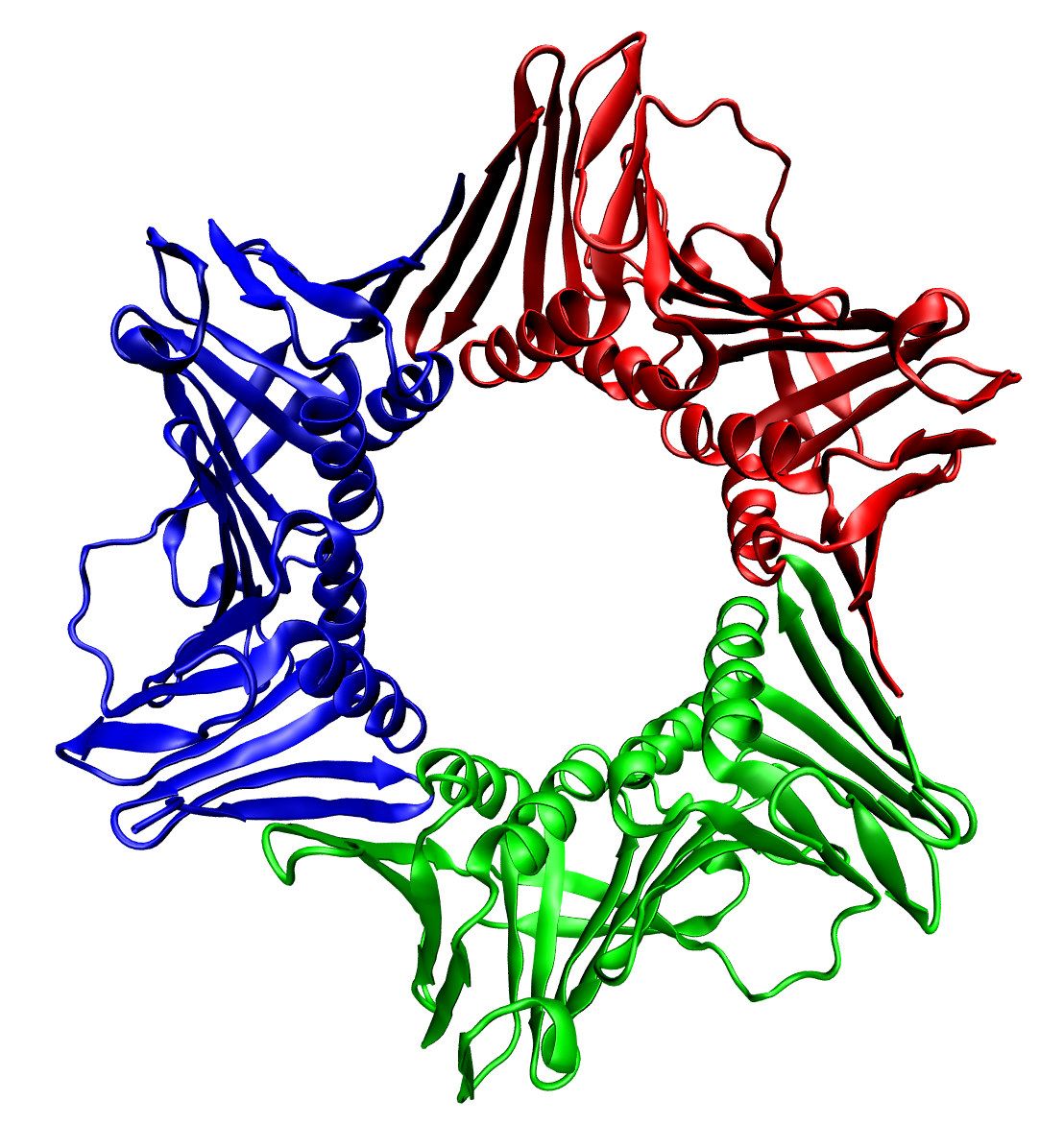

Identifiers
- Aliases: PCNA, ATLD2, proliferating cell nuclear antigen
- External IDs: OMIM: 176740; MGI: 97503; GeneCards: PCNA
Available structures
PDB	Ortholog search: PDBe RCSB
PDB	List of PDB id codes 4D2G, 1AXC, 1U76, 1U7B, 1UL1, 1VYJ, 1VYM, 1W60, 2ZVK, 2ZVL, 2ZVM, 3P87, 3TBL, 3VKX, 3WGW, 4RJF, 3JA9, 4ZTD, 5IY4, 5E0U, 5E0T, 5E0V

Gene location (Human)
Chr.	Chromosome 20 (human)
Band	20p12.3	Start	5,114,953 bp
Band	20p12.3	End	5,126,626 bp

Gene location (Mouse)
Chr.	Chromosome 2 (mouse)
Band	2 F2|2 64.15 cM	Start	132,091,082 bp
Band	2 F2|2 64.15 cM	End	132,095,234 bp
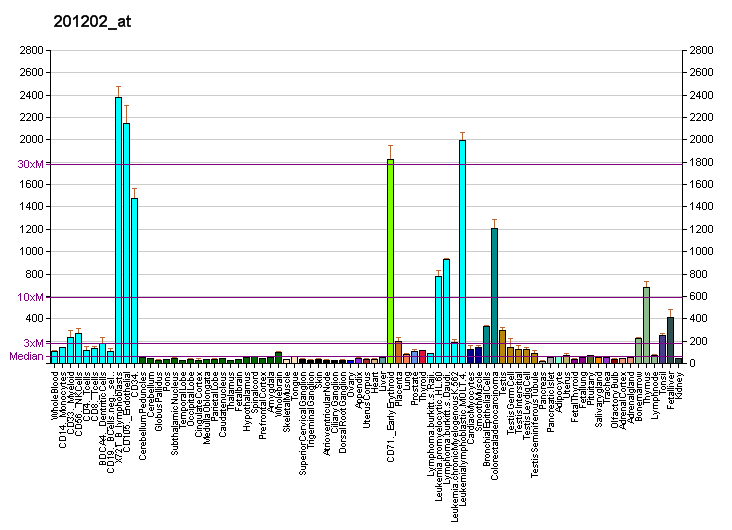
RNA expression pattern
Bgee	Human / Mouse (ortholog); Top expressed in: oocyte; secondary oocyte; ganglionic eminence; ventricular zone; trabecular bone; gonad; mucosa of sigmoid colon; rectum; mucosa of transverse colon; appendix / Top expressed in: thymus; tail of embryo; ventricular zone; genital tubercle; epiblast; yolk sac; bone marrow; embryo; embryo; zygote; More reference expression data
BioGPS	More reference expression data
Gene ontology
Molecular function	MutLalpha complex binding; identical protein binding; enzyme binding; receptor tyrosine kinase binding; DNA binding; DNA polymerase binding; damaged DNA binding; dinucleotide insertion or deletion binding; protein binding; chromatin binding; histone acetyltransferase binding; estrogen receptor binding; purine-specific mismatch base pair DNA N-glycosylase activity; DNA polymerase processivity factor activity
Cellular component	nucleus; replisome; nucleoplasm; extracellular exosome; DNA replication factor C complex; centrosome; PCNA complex; nuclear replication fork; PCNA-p21 complex; replication fork; nuclear body; chromatin
Biological process	replication fork processing; translesion synthesis; DNA replication; nucleotide-excision repair, DNA gap filling; protein sumoylation; regulation of DNA replication; transcription-coupled nucleotide-excision repair; positive regulation of deoxyribonuclease activity; nucleotide-excision repair, DNA incision; error-free translesion synthesis; positive regulation of DNA repair; regulation of transcription involved in G1/S transition of mitotic cell cycle; positive regulation of DNA replication; response to lipid; development of the heart; DNA mismatch repair; cellular response to DNA damage stimulus; mitotic telomere maintenance via semi-conservative replication; epithelial cell differentiation; response to cadmium ion; cell population proliferation; telomere maintenance; error-prone translesion synthesis; cellular response to UV; estrous cycle; cellular response to hydrogen peroxide; response to dexamethasone; nucleotide-excision repair, DNA incision, 5'-to lesion; liver regeneration; response to estradiol; response to oxidative stress; DNA repair; response to L-glutamate; DNA damage response, signal transduction by p53 class mediator resulting in cell cycle arrest; DNA ligation; leading strand elongation; protein ubiquitination; telomere maintenance via semi-conservative replication; viral process
Sources:Amigo / QuickGO
Orthologs
Databases	NCBI: entry; OMA: entry
Species	Human	Mouse
Entrez	5111	18538
Ensembl	ENSG00000132646	ENSMUSG00000027342
UniProt	P12004	P17918
RefSeq (mRNA)	NM_182649; NM_002592	NM_011045
RefSeq (protein)	NP_002583; NP_872590	NP_035175
Location (UCSC)	Chr 20: 5.11 – 5.13 Mb	Chr 2: 132.09 – 132.1 Mb
PubMed search
- Wikidata
View/Edit Human	View/Edit Mouse

Cryo-EM structure of the DNA-bound PolD–PCNA processive complex

Proliferating cell nuclear antigen (PCNA) is a DNA clamp that acts as a processivity factor for DNA polymerase δ in eukaryotic cells and is essential for replication. PCNA is a homotrimer and achieves its processivity by encircling the DNA, where it acts as a scaffold to recruit proteins involved in DNA replication, DNA repair, chromatin remodeling and epigenetics.

Many proteins interact with PCNA via the two known PCNA-interacting motifs PCNA-interacting peptide (PIP) box and AlkB homologue 2 PCNA interacting motif (APIM). Proteins binding to PCNA via the PIP-box are mainly involved in DNA replication whereas proteins binding to PCNA via APIM are mainly important in the context of genotoxic stress.

== Function ==
The protein encoded by this gene is found in the nucleus and is a cofactor of DNA polymerase delta. The encoded protein acts as a homotrimer and helps increase the processivity of leading strand synthesis during DNA replication. In response to DNA damage, this protein is ubiquitinated and is involved in the RAD6-dependent DNA repair pathway. Two transcript variants encoding the same protein have been found for this gene. Pseudogenes of this gene have been described on chromosome 4 and on the X chromosome.

PCNA is also ubiquitous in archaea, where it typically serves as a processivity factor for the replicative polymerases, particularly for polD. However, in the Sulfolobus genus, it also functions as a processivity factor for the replicative polB polymerase.

== Expression in the nucleus during DNA synthesis ==
PCNA was originally identified as an antigen that is expressed in the nuclei of cells during the DNA synthesis phase of the cell cycle. Part of the protein was sequenced and that sequence was used to allow isolation of a cDNA clone. PCNA helps hold DNA polymerase delta (Pol δ) to DNA. PCNA is clamped to DNA through the action of replication factor C (RFC), which is a heteropentameric member of the AAA+ class of ATPases. Expression of PCNA is under the control of E2F transcription factor-containing complexes.

== Role in DNA repair ==
Since DNA polymerase epsilon is involved in resynthesis of excised damaged DNA strands during DNA repair, PCNA is important for both DNA synthesis and DNA repair.

PCNA is also involved in the DNA damage tolerance pathway known as post-replication repair (PRR). In PRR, there are two sub-pathways: (1) a translesion synthesis pathway, which is carried out by specialised DNA polymerases that are able to incorporate damaged DNA bases into their active sites (unlike the normal replicative polymerase, which stall), and hence bypass the damage, and (2) a proposed "template switch" pathway that is thought to involve damage bypass by recruitment of the homologous recombination machinery. PCNA is pivotal to the activation of these pathways and the choice as to which pathway is utilised by the cell. PCNA becomes post-translationally modified by ubiquitin. Mono-ubiquitin of lysine number 164 on PCNA activates the translesion synthesis pathway. Extension of this mono-ubiquitin by a non-canonical lysine-63-linked poly-ubiquitin chain on PCNA is thought to activate the template switch pathway. Furthermore, sumoylation (by small ubiquitin-like modifier, SUMO) of PCNA lysine-164 (and to a lesser extent, lysine-127) inhibits the template switch pathway. This antagonistic effect occurs because sumoylated PCNA recruits a DNA helicase called Srs2, which has a role in disrupting Rad51 nucleoprotein filaments fundamental for initiation of homologous recombination.

== PCNA-binding proteins ==
PCNA interacts with many proteins.

- Apoptotic factors
- ATPases
- Base excision repair enzymes
- Cell-cycle regulators
- Chromatin remodeling factor
- Clamp loader
- Cohesin
- DNA ligase
- DNA methyltransferase
- DNA polymerases
- E2 SUMO-conjugating enzyme
- E3 ubiquitin ligases
- Flap endonuclease
- Helicases
- Histone acetyltransferase
- Histone chaperone
- Histone deacetylase
- Mismatch repair enzymes
- Licensing factor
- NKp44 receptor
- Nucleotide excision repair enzyme
- Poly ADP ribose polymerase
- Procaspases
- Protein kinases
- TCP protein domain
- Topoisomerase

== Interactions ==
PCNA has been shown to interact with:

- Annexin A2
- CAF-1
- CDC25C
- CHTF18
- Cyclin D1
- Cyclin O
- Cyclin-dependent kinase 4
- Cyclin-dependent kinase inhibitor 1C
- DNMT1
- EP300
- Establishment of Sister Chromatid Cohesion 2
- Flap structure-specific endonuclease 1
- GADD45A
- GADD45G
- HDAC1
- HUS1
- ING1
- KCTD13
- KIAA0101
- Ku70
- Ku80
- MCL1
- MSH3
- MSH6
- MUTYH
- P21
- POLD2
- POLD3
- POLDIP2
- POLH
- POLL
- RFC1
- RFC2
- RFC3
- RFC4
- RFC5
- Ubiquitin C
- Werner syndrome ATP-dependent helicase
- XRCC1
- Y box binding protein 1

Proteins interacting with PCNA via APIM include human AlkB homologue 2, TFIIS-L, TFII-I, Rad51B, XPA, ZRANB3, and FBH1.

== Uses ==
Antibodies against proliferating cell nuclear antigen (PCNA) or a similar marker of proliferation termed Ki-67 can be used for grading of different neoplasms, e.g. astrocytoma. They can be of diagnostic and prognostic value. Imaging of the nuclear distribution of PCNA (via antibody labeling) can be used to distinguish between early, mid and late S phase of the cell cycle. However, an important limitation of antibodies is that cells need to be fixed leading to potential artifacts.

On the other hand, the study of the dynamics of replication and repair in living cells can be done by introducing translational fusions of PCNA. To eliminate the need for transfection and bypass the problem of difficult to transfect and/or short lived cells, cell permeable replication and/or repair markers can be used. These peptides offer the distinct advantage that they can be used in situ in living tissue and even distinguish cells undergoing replication from cells undergoing repair.

caPCNA, a post-translationally modified isoform of PCNA common in cancer cells, is a potential therapeutic target in cancer therapy. In 2023 City of Hope National Medical Center published preclinical research on a targeted chemotherapy using AOH1996 that appears to suppress tumor growth without causing discernable side effects.

== See also ==
- Ki-67 – cellular marker for proliferation
- Transcription
