= Protein translocase =

Protein translocase may refer to:

- Translocon complexes SecY and Sec61
- Translocase of the inner membrane
- Translocase of the outer membrane
- See also Sorting and assembly machinery
