= C3orf70 =

Protein-coding gene in the species Homo sapiens

Identifiers
- Aliases: C3orf70, chromosome 3 open reading frame 70
- External IDs: MGI: 1919440; HomoloGene: 78167; GeneCards: C3orf70; OMA:C3orf70 - orthologs

Gene location (Human)
Chr.	Chromosome 3 (human)
Band	3q27.2	Start	185,076,838 bp
Band	3q27.2	End	185,153,060 bp

Gene location (Mouse)
Chr.	Chromosome 16 (mouse)
Band	16|16 B1	Start	21,467,795 bp
Band	16|16 B1	End	21,513,415 bp
RNA expression pattern
Bgee	Human / Mouse (ortholog); Top expressed in: saphenous vein; tail of epididymis; seminal vesicula; subthalamic nucleus; entorhinal cortex; tibia; pons; pars reticulata; internal globus pallidus; medulla oblongata / Top expressed in: habenula; retina; nucleus accumbens; ankle; spinal ganglia; globus pallidus; olfactory tubercle; olfactory epithelium; iris; atrium; More reference expression data
BioGPS	n/a
Orthologs
Species	Human	Mouse
Entrez	285382	72190
Ensembl	ENSG00000187068	ENSMUSG00000043391
UniProt	A6NLC5	Q6GQU0
RefSeq (mRNA)	NM_001025266	NM_001001881
RefSeq (protein)	NP_001020437	NP_001001881
Location (UCSC)	Chr 3: 185.08 – 185.15 Mb	Chr 16: 21.47 – 21.51 Mb
PubMed search
- Wikidata
View/Edit Human	View/Edit Mouse

C3orf70 also known as Chromosome 3 Open Reading Frame 70, is a 250aa protein in humans that is encoded by the C3orf70 gene. The protein encoded is predicted to be a nuclear protein; however, its exact function is currently unknown. C3orf70 can be identified with known aliases: Chromosome 3 Open Reading Frame 70, AK091454, UPF0524, and LOC285382.

== Gene ==
In humans, C3orf70 is located on the reverse strand of Chromosome 3 at 3q27.2 (see Figure 1). This identifies its location starting 184,795,838 base pairs and ending 184,870,802 base pairs from PTER, the terminus of the short arm, on chromosome 3. C3orf70 spans 74,964 bases containing two exons and two introns.

== mRNA ==
The transcribed mRNA is a 5,901 base pair transcript. C3orf70 consists of one known splice variant with two exons of 388 base pairs and 5,512 base pairs respectively (see Figure 2); location of junction occurs at 67aa[C]. A single 5’ cap and three possible 3’ polyadenylation signals have been identified.

== Protein ==
=== Composition ===
The translated protein is a 250 amino acid product. The precursor protein has been predicted with a molecular weight of 27.8kdal and an isoelectric point of 4.67. With 33 serines and 8 glycines, the C3orf70 protein is both Serine rich and Glycine poor.

=== Domains ===
C3orf70 protein has no known signal peptides or domains.

== Homology ==
C3orf70 has no known paralogs in humans; however C3orf70 has conserved homologs, see Figure 3. Highly conserved across species excluding invertebrates, plants, fungi, and bacteria, C3orf70 shows a moderate rate of evolution, see Figure 4 and 5.

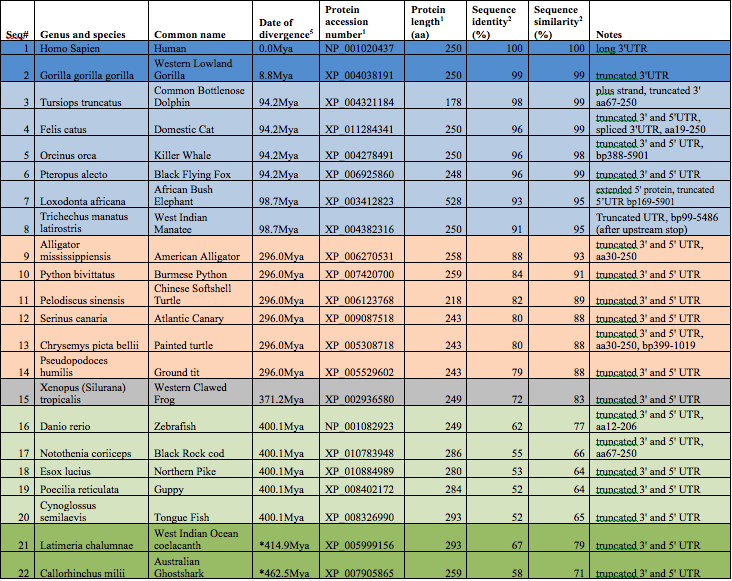
Figure 3: Compiled data for select orthologs of C3orf70 across species

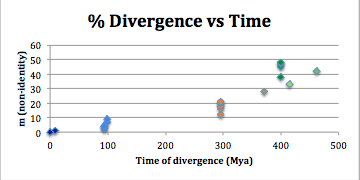
Figure 4: C3orf70 Homolog Protein Divergence from Homo sapiens. Color identification specific to species (shown in Figure 3). Time of divergence calculated by timetree.org. Non-identity calculated based on (1-NCBI sequence identity).

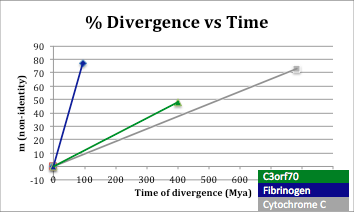
Figure 5: Divergence rate of C3orf70 with respect to Cytochrome C and Fibrinogen displaying a moderate to slow rate of divergence.

== Regulation ==
=== Transcription ===
==== Promoter ====
There is only one known promoter predicted by Genomatix for the C3orf70 protein located on the minus strand of chromosome 3 at location 184870702-184871302bp, therefore identified as 600bp in length. High mammalian conservation was observed for the identified promoter sequence.

==== Transcription factors ====
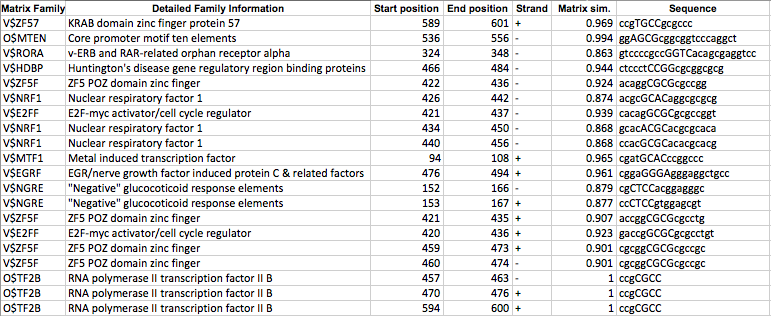
Figure 6: Generated list of a selection of transcription factor binding sites in the C3orf70 promoter

Through the use of Genomatix, a table was generated of the top 20 transcription factors and their binding sites in the C3orf70 promoter (see Figure 6).

=== Translation ===
==== Post-translational modifications ====
Utilizing NetPhos, a total of 25 phosphorylation sites have been predicted (20 Serines, 3 Threonines, and 2 Tyrosines) which occur throughout the protein indicating an intracellular localization. Figure 7 pinpoints the location of the 25 potential phosphorylation sites. Additionally, two N-myrisolation sites were predicted at amino acid position 40-45 and 210-215 indicating a possible N-terminus and C-terminus membrane anchor region. There are also 28 potential missense mutations in the human C3orf70.

==== Subcellular localization ====
PSORT II indicates the subcellular localization of C3orf70 is in the nucleus. In addition to this, following SDSC's Biology Workbench's SAPS kNN-Prediction, the C3orf70 protein for humans has a 60.9% likelihood to end up in the nuclear region of a cell, as determined by the amino acid make-up of C3orf70. Homologs including chimp, mouse, alligator, and zebrafish conclude the same nuclear region with a >60% likelihood. A nuclear localization site has not been identified in the C3orf70 sequence.

== Expression ==
From Unigene's EST cDNA tissue abundance display (see Figure 8), C3orf70 is non-ubiquitously expressed and has relatively low expression levels with slightly higher expression levels seen in the brain. Also, microarray data profile GDS426 (see Figure 9) showing the expression of C3orf70 across normal tissues displays a notably high presence in the brain, spinal cord, and prostate tissue.

=== Function and further reading ===
The function of C3orf70 is unknown. It is suggested to be a nuclear protein that plays a role in neurological development. Additional avenues of research pertaining to the C3orf70 gene include:

There is a patent that identified genes associated with midbrain dopamine neurons for engraftment by looking at the differentiation of hESC and/or hiPSC in floor plate midbrain progenitor cells. C3orf70 was found to have a fold-change of 2.45, which was not determined significant in experimentation

A publication was discovered through multiple sources that linked the C3orf70 gene to a “Genome-wide association study of major depressive disorder”.

A microdeletion has been identified from 3q26.33-3q27.2. Mandrille et al. associates this discovered microdeletion with a possible clinical syndrome characterized by clinical features related to brain development.
