= PSORTdb =

Database of protein localization

Content
- Description: protein subcellular localization database
- Organisms: Prokaryotes

Contact
- Research center: Simon Fraser University
- Laboratory: Department of Molecular Biology and Biochemistry
- Authors: Sébastien Rey
- Primary citation: Rey & al. (2005)
- Release date: 2010 (v. 2.0)

Access
- Website: http://db.psort.org/

Miscellaneous
- License: GNU General Public License
- Version: 2.0

PSORTdb is a database of protein subcellular localization (SCL) for bacteria and archaea. It is a member of the PSORT family of bioinformatics tools. The database consists of two datasets, ePSORTdb and cPSORTdb, which contain information determined through experimental validation and computational prediction, respectively. The ePSORTdb dataset is the largest curated collection of experimentally verified SCL data.

PSORTdb was initially developed in 2005 in order to contain protein subcellular localization predictions for bacteria. The computational predictions in the cPSORTdb dataset were generated by the PSORT tool PSORTb 2.0, the most accurate SCL predictor of the time.

The second and current version of PSORTdb was released in 2010. Entries in the database are automatically generated as newly sequenced prokaryotic genomes become available through NCBI. As of the second release, ePSORTdb contained over 12,000 entries for bacterial proteins and 800 entries for archaeal proteins; cPSORTdb contained SCL predictions for over 3,700,000 proteins in total. The ePSORTdb data is derived from a manual literature search (using PubMed) as well as Swiss-Prot annotations. The cPSORTdb predictions are generated using the updated PSORTb 3.0 tool.

PSORTdb can be accessed through a web interface or via BLAST. The entire database is also available for download under the GNU General Public License. Each term in the database is associated with an identifier from the Gene Ontology in order to allow integration with other bioinformatics resources.

As of 2014, PSORTdb is maintained through the laboratory of Fiona Brinkman at Simon Fraser University.

== See also ==
- Protein targeting
