= SGTA =

Identifiers
- Aliases: SGTA, SGT, alphaSGT, hSGT, small glutamine rich tetratricopeptide repeat containing alpha, small glutamine rich tetratricopeptide repeat co-chaperone alpha, SGT1, Vpu
- External IDs: OMIM: 603419; MGI: 1098703; GeneCards: SGTA
Available structures
| PDB | Ortholog search: PDBe RCSB |
| PDB | List of PDB id codes 2VYI, 4CPG, 4GOD, 4GOE, 4GOF |

Gene location (Human)
| Chr. | Chromosome 19 (human) |
| Band | 19p13.3 | Start | 2,754,715 bp |
| Band | 19p13.3 | End | 2,783,362 bp |

Gene location (Mouse)
| Chr. | Chromosome 10 (mouse) |
| Band | 10 C1|10 39.72 cM | Start | 80,879,909 bp |
| Band | 10 C1|10 39.72 cM | End | 80,896,015 bp |
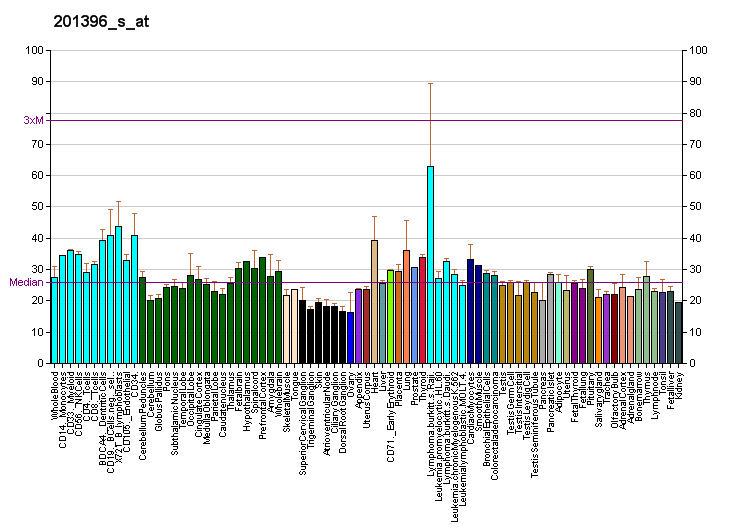
RNA expression pattern
| Bgee | Human / Mouse (ortholog); Top expressed in: apex of heart; C1 segment; muscle of thigh; gastrocnemius muscle; right frontal lobe; middle frontal gyrus; right auricle of heart; paraflocculus of cerebellum; cingulate gyrus; anterior pituitary / Top expressed in: perirhinal cortex; entorhinal cortex; ventricular zone; primary visual cortex; yolk sac; muscle of thigh; lip; superior frontal gyrus; lactiferous gland; neural tube; More reference expression data |
| BioGPS | More reference expression data |
Gene ontology
| Molecular function | protein binding; BAT3 complex binding; protein self-association; identical protein binding; molecular adaptor activity |
| Cellular component | cytosol; membrane; nucleus; cytoplasm; presynapse; extrinsic component of synaptic vesicle membrane; TRC complex |
| Biological process | positive regulation of ER-associated ubiquitin-dependent protein catabolic process; viral process; ubiquitin-dependent ERAD pathway; negative regulation of ER-associated ubiquitin-dependent protein catabolic process; negative regulation of ubiquitin-dependent protein catabolic process; tail-anchored membrane protein insertion into ER membrane; chaperone-mediated protein folding; posttranslational protein targeting to endoplasmic reticulum membrane; positive regulation of chaperone-mediated protein folding |
Sources:Amigo / QuickGO
Orthologs
| Databases | NCBI: entry; OMA: entry |
| Species | Human | Mouse |
| Entrez | 6449 | 52551 |
| Ensembl | ENSG00000104969 | ENSMUSG00000004937 |
| UniProt | O43765 | Q8BJU0 |
| RefSeq (mRNA) | NM_003021 | NM_024499; NM_001358549; NM_001358550 |
| RefSeq (protein) | NP_003012 | NP_078775; NP_001345478; NP_001345479 |
| Location (UCSC) | Chr 19: 2.75 – 2.78 Mb | Chr 10: 80.88 – 80.9 Mb |
| PubMed search |
- Wikidata
| View/Edit Human | View/Edit Mouse |

Small glutamine-rich tetratricopeptide repeat-containing protein alpha is a protein that in humans is encoded by the SGTA gene. SGTA orthologs have also been identified in several mammals for which complete genome data are available. STGA belongs to a family of co-chaperone proteins that obtain a TPR motif. STGA was discovered just 15 years ago.

== Function ==
The molecular function of the protein states that SGTA is a small glutamine-rich tetratricopeptide repeat (TRP)-containing protein, ubiquitously expressed, interacting with the NS1 protein of parvovirus H-1.

The SGTA gene encodes a protein that is capable of interacting with the major nonstructural protein of parvovirus H-1 and 70-kDa heat shock cognate protein; however, its function is not known. Since this transcript is expressed ubiquitously in various tissues, this protein may serve a housekeeping function.

Overview of main functions:

- hormone signaling
- viral assembly and release
- cell cycle and apoptosis
- intracellular compartmentalization
- neuronal synaptic transmission
- post-translational transport and modification of proteins.

Small glutamine-rich tetratricopeptide repeat-containing protein alpha (STGA) acts as a co-chaperone and regulator of androgen and growth hormone receptor signaling. The protein also mediates targets to the endoplasmic reticulum

== Interactions ==
SGTA has been shown to interact with Growth hormone receptor.

Interacting Proteins for the SGTA Gene:

- HSPA4
- BAG6
- UBL4A
- HSPA8
- GET4

== Associated Diseases ==
- Prostate, ovary, liver, and esophagus cancer
- Hormone-related polycystic ovary syndrome
- Amyloid-related Alzheimer's
- Prion Diseases
