= Bil Clemons =

American structural biologist

William M. Clemons, Jr.
- Education: Virginia Tech (BS); University of Utah (PhD)
- Known for: Atomic structures of the ribosome, translocon
- Scientific career
- Fields: Structural biology; Membrane proteins
- Workplaces: California Institute of Technology; IOCB Prague; Harvard Medical School; Laboratory of Molecular Biology
- Thesis: The structure of the small ribosomal subunit (2000)
- Doctoral advisor: Venki Ramakrishnan
- Other academic advisors: Tom Rapoport; Stephen C. Harrison
- Website: http://clemonslab.caltech.edu

William "Bil" Clemons, Jr. is an American structural biologist and Professor of Biochemistry at Caltech. He is best known for his work solving the atomic structure of the ribosome with dissertation advisor, Nobel Prize winner in chemistry Venki Ramakrishnan. He is also known for his work on the structure and function of proteins involved in membrane translocation and docking of proteins, including the membrane protein translocation channel SecY, chaperones involved in the targeting of tail-anchored membrane proteins in the Get pathway, and signal recognition proteins of the Twin-arginine translocation pathway. He was elected a member of the National Academy of Sciences in 2022.

== Education ==
Clemons received a B.S. in biochemistry from Virginia Polytechnic Institute and State University in 1995. In 2000, he received his Ph.D. in biochemistry from the University of Utah while working jointly with the Laboratory of Molecular Biology, in Cambridge, England under the advisement of Venki Ramakrishnan. He then spent four years, from 2001 to 2005, as a postdoctoral fellow under Professor Tom Rapoport in the Department of Cell Biology at Harvard Medical School.

== Career ==
In January 2006, Clemons began as an assistant professor in the Chemistry and Chemical Engineering Division at the California Institute of Technology. In 2013, Clemons became professor of Biochemistry. He has also held a Visiting Professor appointment from 2018-2019 at the Institute of Organic Chemistry & Biochemistry, Prague, Czech Republic.

=== Diversity and Inclusion ===
As a member of the President's Diversity Council at Caltech, Clemons mentors and advocates for diversity and enrollment of minority students in STEM education. He has spoken on the intersection of science and diversity as an invited speaker.

Clemons serves as a Science Program Officer for the Chan Zuckerberg Initiative.

== Honors and awards ==
- 2018 Virginia Tech Biochemistry - Distinguished Alumni
- 2017 Dr. Fred Shair Award for Programming Diversity
- 2011-2016 NIH Pioneer Award
- 2005-2010 Burroughs Wellcome Career Award in the Biomedical Sciences
