= Topogenic sequence =

A topogenic sequence is a collective term used for a peptide sequence present at nascent proteins essential for their insertion and orienting in cellular membranes. The sequences are also used to translocate proteins across various intracellular membranes, and ensure they are transported to the correct organelle after synthesis. The position of the sequence may be at the end, e.g. N-terminal signal sequence, or in mid parts of the nascent protein, e.g. stop-transfer anchor sequences and signal-anchor sequences. If the sequence is at the end of the polypeptide, it is cleaved off after entering the ER-lumen (via a translocon) by a signal peptidase, and subsequently degraded.

As an example, the vast majority of all known complex plastid preproteins (an 'unactivated' protein) encoded in the nucleus possess a topogenic sequence.

== See also ==
- Protein targeting
- Target peptide
- Translocon
- Signal peptide
