= TBRG4 =

Protein-coding gene in the species Homo sapiens

Identifiers
- Aliases: TBRG4, CPR2, FASTKD4, transforming growth factor beta regulator 4
- External IDs: OMIM: 611325; MGI: 1100868; HomoloGene: 31259; GeneCards: TBRG4; OMA:TBRG4 - orthologs

Gene location (Human)
Chr.	Chromosome 7 (human)
Band	7p13	Start	45,100,100 bp
Band	7p13	End	45,112,047 bp

Gene location (Mouse)
Chr.	Chromosome 11 (mouse)
Band	11|11 A1	Start	6,565,598 bp
Band	11|11 A1	End	6,576,067 bp
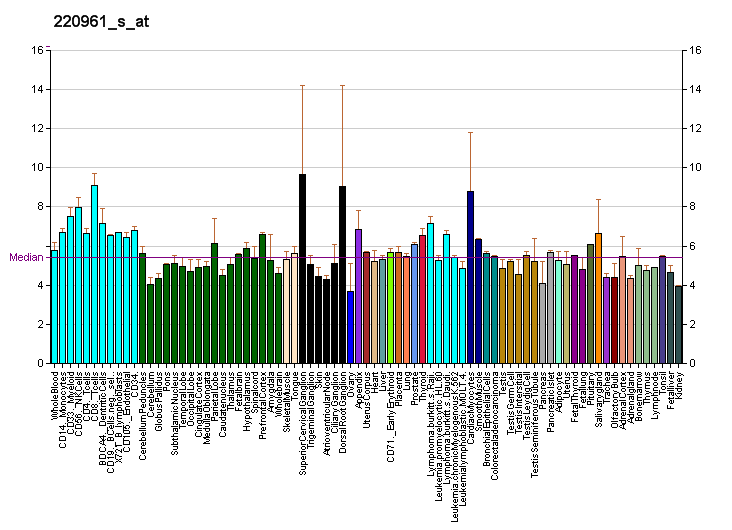

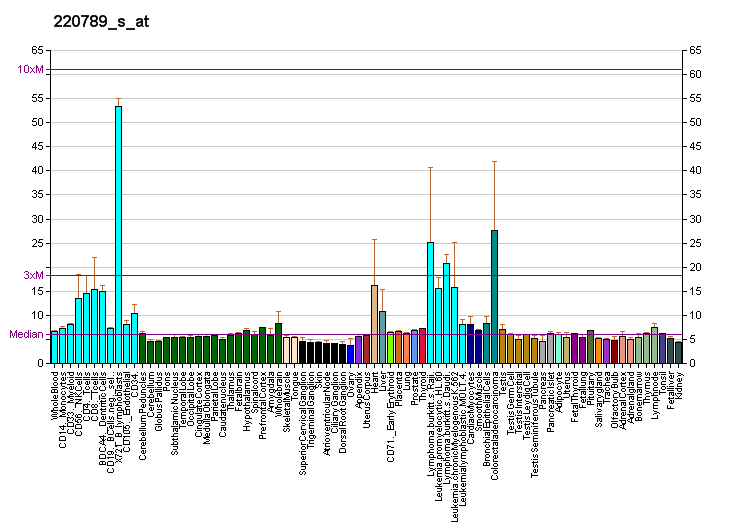
RNA expression pattern
Bgee	Human / Mouse (ortholog); Top expressed in: mucosa of transverse colon; apex of heart; granulocyte; gastrocnemius muscle; rectum; muscle of thigh; skin of leg; right ovary; body of stomach; minor salivary glands / Top expressed in: epiblast; primitive streak; yolk sac; tail of embryo; internal carotid artery; granulocyte; muscle of thigh; hair follicle; endothelial cell of lymphatic vessel; condyle; More reference expression data
BioGPS	More reference expression data
Gene ontology
Molecular function	protein kinase activity; protein binding; RNA binding
Cellular component	mitochondrion; mitochondrial matrix
Biological process	cellular respiration; protein phosphorylation; positive regulation of cell population proliferation; mRNA metabolic process; regulation of mitochondrial mRNA stability; mitochondrial mRNA processing
Sources:Amigo / QuickGO
Orthologs
Species	Human	Mouse
Entrez	9238	21379
Ensembl	ENSG00000136270	ENSMUSG00000000384
UniProt	Q969Z0	Q91YM4
RefSeq (mRNA)	NM_199122; NM_001261834; NM_004749; NM_030900	NM_001130457; NM_134011; NM_001362713; NM_001362714; NM_001362715 NM_001362716
RefSeq (protein)	NP_001248763; NP_004740; NP_112162; NP_954573	NP_001123929; NP_598772; NP_001349642; NP_001349643; NP_001349644 NP_001349645
Location (UCSC)	Chr 7: 45.1 – 45.11 Mb	Chr 11: 6.57 – 6.58 Mb
PubMed search
- Wikidata
View/Edit Human	View/Edit Mouse

Transforming growth factor beta regulator 4 (TBRG4), also known as cell cycle progression restoration protein 2 (CPR2) and FAST kinase domain-containing protein 4 (FASTKD4), is a protein that in humans is encoded by the TBRG4 gene on chromosome 7. This protein is part of the FASTKD family, which is known for regulating the energy balance of mitochondria under stress and cell cycle progression. TBRG4 is involved in cell proliferation in hematopoiesis and multiple myeloma.

== Structure ==
TBRG4 shares structural characteristics of the FASTKD family, including an N-terminal mitochondrial targeting domain and three C-terminal domains: two FAST kinase-like domains (FAST_1 and FAST_2) and a RNA-binding domain (RAP). The mitochondrial targeting domain directs TBRG4 to be imported into the mitochondria. Though the functions of the C-terminal domains are unknown, RAP possibly binds RNA during trans-splicing. TBRG4 also contains multiple putative leucine zipper domains.

== Function ==
As a member of the FASTKD family, TBRG4 localizes to the mitochondria to modulate their energy balance, especially under conditions of stress. Though ubiquitously expressed in all tissues, TBRG4 appears more abundantly in skeletal muscle, heart muscle, and other tissues enriched in mitochondria. TBRG4 also localizes to the bone marrow (BM), where it functions in hematopoiesis by inducing IL-6 and VEGF secretion, which then stimulate cell proliferation and angiogenesis. However, it inhibits immunoglobulin secretions by normal B cells.

== Clinical significance ==
The involvement of TBRG4 in hematopoiesis links it to multiple myeloma (MM), which stems from malignant proliferation of plasma cells in the bone marrow. High expression of TBRG4 has been linked to enhanced cell proliferation and poorer outcome; thus, downregulation of its expression may contribute to reducing tumor growth by arresting cell cycle progression.
