= SecY protein =

SecY protein/Sec61α
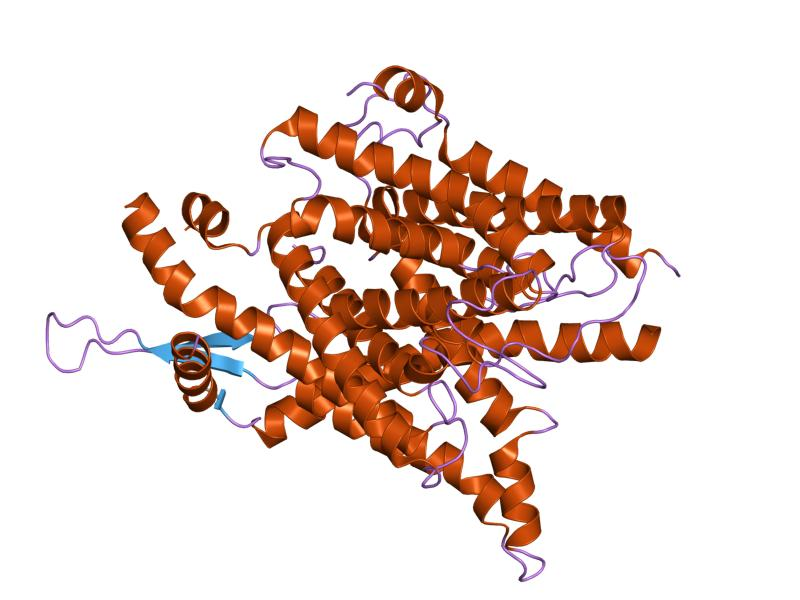
- Structure of a protein-conducting channel.

Identifiers
- Symbol: SecY
- Pfam: PF00344
- InterPro: IPR002208
- PROSITE: PDOC00612
- SCOP2: 1rh5 / SCOPe / SUPFAM
- TCDB: 3.A.5
- OPM superfamily: 19
- OPM protein: 1rh5
- Membranome: 165
Available protein structures:
- PDB: IPR002208 PF00344 (ECOD; PDBsum)
- AlphaFold: IPR002208; PF00344

The SecY protein is the main transmembrane subunit of the bacterial Sec export pathway and of a protein-secreting ATPase complex, also known as a SecYEG translocon. Homologs of the SecYEG complex are found in eukaryotes and in archaea, where the subunit is known as Sec61α.

Secretion of some proteins carrying a signal-peptide across the inner membrane in Gram-negative bacteria occurs via the preprotein translocase pathway. Proteins are produced in the cytoplasm as precursors, and require a chaperone subunit to direct them to the translocase component within the membrane. From there, the mature proteins are either targeted to the outer membrane or remain as periplasmic proteins. The translocase protein subunits are encoded on the bacterial chromosome.

The translocase pathway comprises 7 proteins, including a chaperone protein (SecB), an ATPase (SecA), an integral membrane complex (SecY, SecE, and SecG), and two additional membrane proteins that promote the release of the mature peptide into the periplasm (SecD and SecF). The chaperone protein SecB is a highly acidic homotetrameric protein that exists as a "dimer of dimers" in the bacterial cytoplasm. SecB maintains preproteins in an unfolded state after translation and targets these to the peripheral membrane protein ATPase SecA for secretion.

Cytoplasmic regions 2 and 3, and TM domains 1, 2, 4, 5, 7, and 10 are well conserved: the conserved cytoplasmic regions are believed to interact with cytoplasmic secretion factors, while the TM domains may participate in protein export. SecY is also encoded in the chloroplast genome of some algae where it could be involved in a prokaryotic-like protein export system across the two membranes of the chloroplast endoplasmic reticulum (CER) which is present in chromophyte and cryptophyte algae.

== Subfamilies ==
- SecY-related translocase InterPro: IPR014269

== In mitochondria ==
SecY proteins were found in the mitochondrial genomes of jakobids and Mantamonas sphyraenae, two lineages of eukaryotes that possess among the most gene-rich mitogenomes.

The discovery of SecY in Mantamonas helped resolve the evolutionary origin of this protein in jakobids, serving as the missing link to alphaproteobacteria.

== Human proteins containing this domain ==
SEC61A1; SEC61A2;

== See also ==
- Sec61
- Translocon
- Protein targeting
- Bacterial secretion system
