= RRBP1 =

Protein-coding gene in the species Homo sapiens

Identifiers
- Aliases: RRBP1, ES/130, ES130, RRp, hES, ribosome binding protein 1, p180
- External IDs: OMIM: 601418; GeneCards: RRBP1

Gene location (Human)
Chr.	Chromosome 20 (human)
Band	20p12.1	Start	17,613,678 bp
Band	20p12.1	End	17,682,295 bp
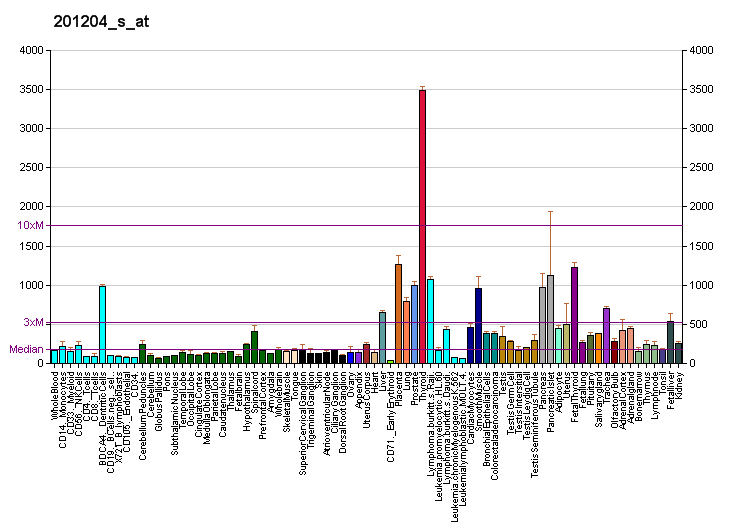

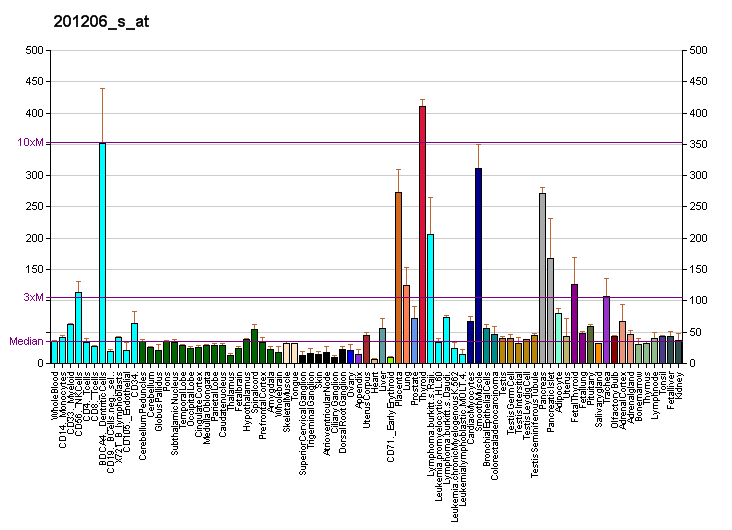

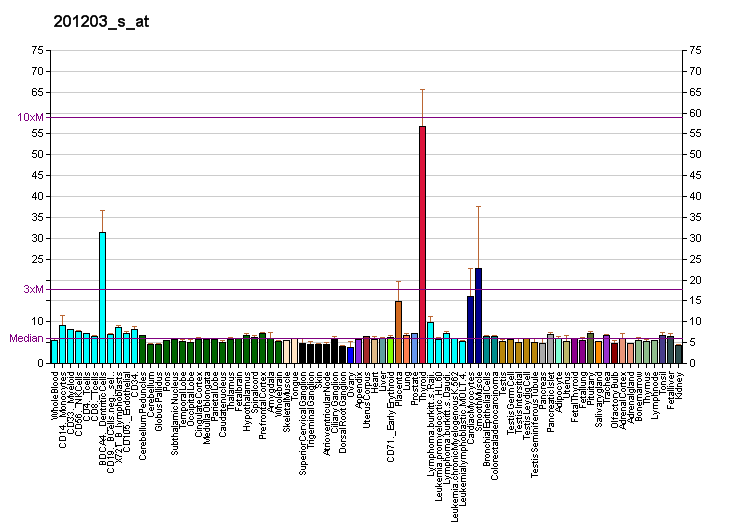
RNA expression pattern
Bgee	Human / Mouse (ortholog); Top expressed in: body of pancreas; parotid gland; tendon of biceps brachii; pylorus; stromal cell of endometrium; sural nerve; right lobe of liver; epithelium of colon; mucosa of nose; mucosa of transverse colon / n/a; More reference expression data
BioGPS	More reference expression data
Gene ontology
Molecular function	RNA binding; signaling receptor activity
Cellular component	integral component of membrane; integral component of endoplasmic reticulum membrane; ribosome; endoplasmic reticulum; membrane; endoplasmic reticulum membrane
Biological process	protein transport; protein biosynthesis; osteoblast differentiation; transport
Sources:Amigo / QuickGO
Orthologs
Databases	NCBI: entry; OMA: entry
Species	Human	Mouse
Entrez	6238	n/a
Ensembl	ENSG00000125844	n/a
UniProt	Q9P2E9	n/a
RefSeq (mRNA)	NM_004587; NM_001042576; NM_001365613	n/a
RefSeq (protein)	NP_001036041; NP_004578; NP_001352542	n/a
Location (UCSC)	Chr 20: 17.61 – 17.68 Mb	n/a
PubMed search		n/a
- Wikidata
View/Edit Human

Ribosome-binding protein 1, also referred to as p180, is a protein that in humans is encoded by the RRBP1 gene.

== Subcellular distribution ==
RRBP1 is a membrane-bound protein found in the endoplasmic reticulum (ER).

== Structure ==
Although the p180 isoform is the most abundant, it may exist in different forms due to removal of tandem repeats by partial intraexonic splicing.

== Function ==
It was originally identified as the ribosome receptor for the ER, however several groups later demonstrated that this activity did not co-fractionate with RRBP1 but rather with Sec61 (i.e. the translocon). RRBP1 can enhance the association of certain mRNAs to the endoplasmic reticulum in a manner that does not require ribosome activity, likely by directly associating the mRNA's phosphate backbone. In addition, RRBP1 may promote the association of polysomes with the translocon and play a role in ER morphology. RRBP1 may also bind to microtubules.

== Clinical significance ==
RRBP1 has been excluded as a candidate gene in the cause of Alagille syndrome.
