= Signal patch =

Patch of a protein which determines its final location in the cell

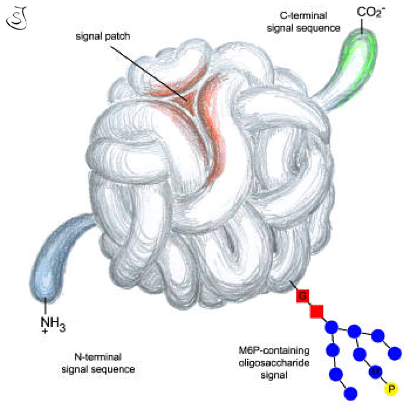
Schematic of 4 different protein signals that enable localisation in the cell

A protein signal patch contains information to send a given protein to a location in the cell. It is made up of amino acid residues that are distant to one another in the primary sequence, but come close to each other in the tertiary structure of the folded protein (see red patch in the diagram). Signal patches, unlike some signal sequences, are not cleaved from the mature protein after sorting. They are very difficult to predict. Nuclear localization signals are often signal patches although signal sequences also exist. They are found on proteins destined for the nucleus and enable their selective transport from the cytosol into the nucleus through the nuclear pore complexes.

== See also ==
- protein targeting
- signal peptide
