= P180 =

P180 may refer to

- Piaggio P.180 Avanti, an Italian twin-engine turboprop aircraft.
- RRBP1 (also known as p180), a human gene that encodes a membrane-bound protein of the endoplasmic reticulum.
