= SEC63 =

Protein-coding gene in the species Homo sapiens

Identifiers
- Aliases: SEC63, DNAJC23, ERdj2, PRO2507, SEC63L, SEC63 homolog, protein translocation regulator, PCLD2
- External IDs: OMIM: 608648; MGI: 2155302; HomoloGene: 5220; GeneCards: SEC63; OMA:SEC63 - orthologs

Gene location (Human)
Chr.	Chromosome 6 (human)
Band	6q21	Start	107,867,756 bp
Band	6q21	End	107,958,208 bp

Gene location (Mouse)
Chr.	Chromosome 10 (mouse)
Band	10 B2|10 22.89 cM	Start	42,637,492 bp
Band	10 B2|10 22.89 cM	End	42,708,510 bp
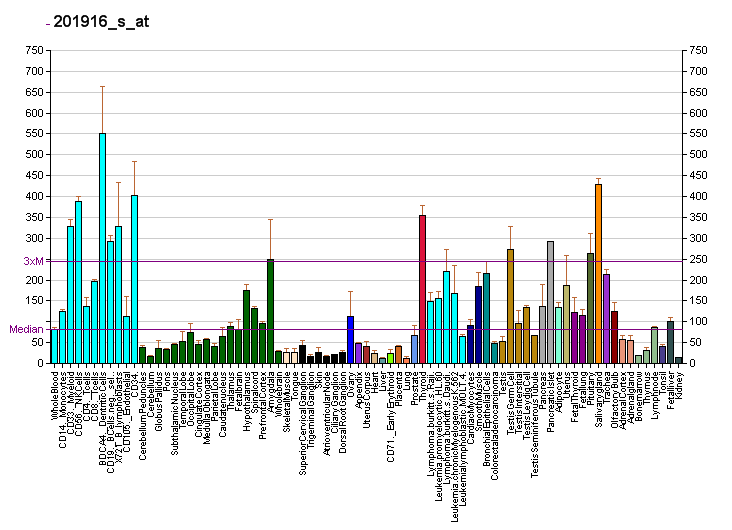

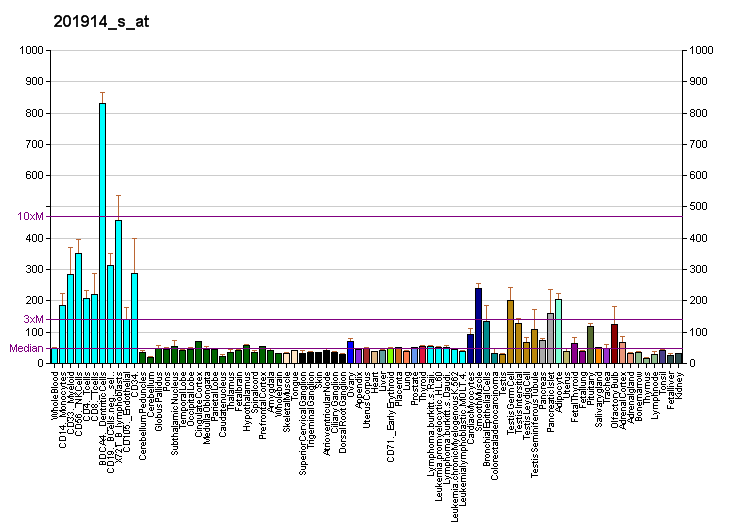

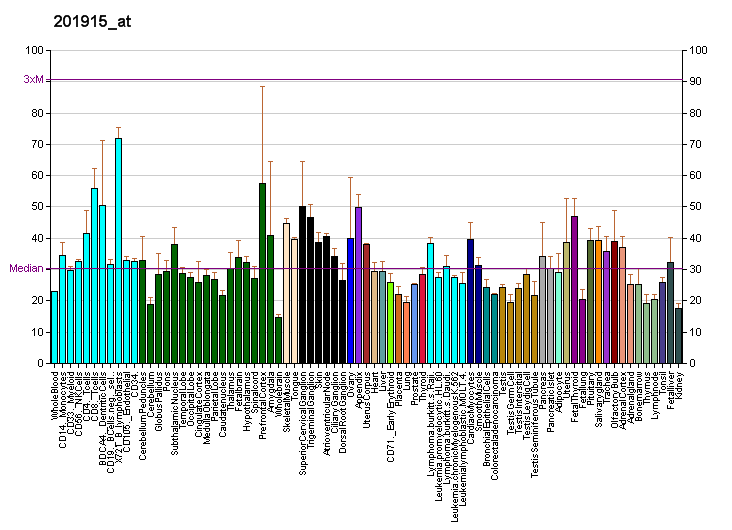
RNA expression pattern
Bgee	Human / Mouse (ortholog); Top expressed in: epithelium of colon; body of pancreas; parotid gland; stromal cell of endometrium; bone marrow cells; ganglionic eminence; ventricular zone; left ovary; olfactory zone of nasal mucosa; right ovary / Top expressed in: seminal vesicula; parotid gland; lacrimal gland; neural layer of retina; saccule; ventricular zone; left lobe of liver; tail of embryo; otic placode; crypt of lieberkuhn of small intestine; More reference expression data
BioGPS	More reference expression data
Gene ontology
Molecular function	protein binding; RNA binding; signaling receptor activity
Cellular component	endoplasmic reticulum membrane; cytosol; integral component of membrane; membrane; endoplasmic reticulum; Sec62/Sec63 complex
Biological process	IRE1-mediated unfolded protein response; protein targeting to membrane; liver development; protein transport; SRP-dependent cotranslational protein targeting to membrane; multicellular organism aging; renal system development; nitrogen compound metabolic process; posttranslational protein targeting to endoplasmic reticulum membrane; posttranslational protein targeting to membrane, translocation; transport
Sources:Amigo / QuickGO
Orthologs
Species	Human	Mouse
Entrez	11231	140740
Ensembl	ENSG00000025796	ENSMUSG00000019802
UniProt	Q9UGP8	Q8VHE0
RefSeq (mRNA)	NM_007214; NM_018529	NM_153055; NM_001359283; NM_001359284; NM_001359285; NM_001359286
RefSeq (protein)	NP_009145	NP_694695; NP_001346212; NP_001346213; NP_001346214; NP_001346215
Location (UCSC)	Chr 6: 107.87 – 107.96 Mb	Chr 10: 42.64 – 42.71 Mb
PubMed search
- Wikidata
View/Edit Human	View/Edit Mouse

Translocation protein SEC63 homolog is a protein that in humans is encoded by the SEC63 gene.

== Function ==
The Sec61 complex is the central component of the protein translocation apparatus of the endoplasmic reticulum (ER) membrane. The protein encoded by this gene and SEC62 protein are found to be associated with ribosome-free SEC61 complex. It is speculated that Sec61-Sec62-Sec63 may perform post-translational protein translocation into the ER. The Sec61-Sec62-Sec63 complex might also perform the backward transport of ER proteins that are subject to the ubiquitin-proteasome-dependent degradation pathway. The encoded protein is an integral membrane protein located in the rough ER.

== Clinical significance ==
Mutations of this gene have been linked with autosomal dominant polycystic liver disease.
