= SecDF protein-export membrane protein =

SecD_SecF

Identifiers
- Symbol: SecD_SecF
- Pfam: PF02355
- Pfam clan: CL0322
- InterPro: IPR022645
- TCDB: 2.A.6.4
- OPM superfamily: 16
- OPM protein: 3aqp
- Membranome: 436
Available protein structures:
- PDB: IPR022645 PF02355 (ECOD; PDBsum)
- AlphaFold: IPR022645; PF02355

SecD and SecF are prokaryotic protein export membrane proteins. They are a part of the larger multimeric protein export complex comprising SecA, D, E, F, G, Y, and YajC. SecD and SecF are required to maintain a proton motive force.

Secretion across the inner membrane in some Gram-negative bacteria occurs via the preprotein translocase pathway. Proteins are produced in the cytoplasm as precursors, and require a chaperone subunit to direct them to the translocase component. From there, the mature proteins are either targeted to the outer membrane, or remain as periplasmic proteins. The translocase protein subunits are encoded on the bacterial chromosome.

The translocase itself comprises 7 proteins, including a chaperone protein (SecB), an ATPase (SecA), an integral membrane complex (SecCY, SecE and SecG), and two additional membrane proteins that promote the release of the mature peptide into the periplasm (SecD and SecF). The chaperone protein SecB is a highly acidic homotetrameric protein that exists as a "dimer of dimers" in the bacterial cytoplasm. SecB maintains preproteins in an unfolded state after translation, and targets these to the peripheral membrane protein ATPase SecA for secretion. Together with SecY and SecG, SecE forms a multimeric channel through which preproteins are translocated, using both proton motive forces and ATP-driven secretion. The latter is mediated by SecA. The structure of the Escherichia coli SecYEG assembly revealed a sandwich of two membranes interacting through the extensive cytoplasmic domains. Each membrane is composed of dimers of SecYEG. The monomeric complex contains 15 transmembrane helices.

This family consists of various prokaryotic SecD and SecF protein export membrane proteins. The SecD and SecF equivalents of the Gram-positive bacterium Bacillus subtilis are jointly present in one polypeptide, denoted SecDF, that is required to maintain a high capacity for protein secretion. Unlike the SecD subunit of the pre-protein translocase of E. coli, SecDF of B. subtilis was not required for the release of a mature secretory protein from the membrane, indicating that SecDF is involved in earlier translocation steps. Comparison with SecD and SecF proteins from other organisms revealed the presence of 10 conserved regions in SecDF, some of which appear to be important for SecDF function. The SecDF protein of B. subtilis has 12 putative transmembrane domains. Thus, SecDF does not only show sequence similarity but also structural similarity to secondary solute transporters.
