= Sec61 =

SecE/Sec61γ

Identifiers
- Symbol: SecE
- Pfam: PF00584
- InterPro: IPR001901
- PROSITE: PS01067
- SCOP2: 1rhz / SCOPe / SUPFAM
- TCDB: 3.A.5
- OPM protein: 1rhz
Available protein structures:
- PDB: IPR001901 PF00584 (ECOD; PDBsum)
- AlphaFold: IPR001901; PF00584

Sec61, termed SecYEG in prokaryotes, is a membrane protein complex found in all domains of life. As the core component of the translocon, it transports proteins to the endoplasmic reticulum in eukaryotes and out of the cell in prokaryotes. It is a doughnut-shaped pore through the membrane with 3 different subunits (heterotrimeric), SecY (α), SecE (γ), and SecG (β). It has a region called the plug that blocks transport into or out of the ER. This plug is displaced when the hydrophobic region of a nascent polypeptide interacts with another region of Sec61 called the seam, allowing translocation of the polypeptide into the ER lumen.

Although SecY and SecE are conserved in all three domains of life, bacterial SecG is only weakly homologous with eukaryotic Sec61β. The eukaryotic Sec61β is however homologous to the archaeal "SecG", leading some authors to refer to the archaeal complex as SecYEβ instead of SecYEG. (All three components of the archaeal complex are closer to their eukaryotic homologues than to their bacterial ones, but the old two-empire names have become convention.)

== Structure ==
X-ray structure of the archaeal SecYEβ (PDB: 1RHZ).

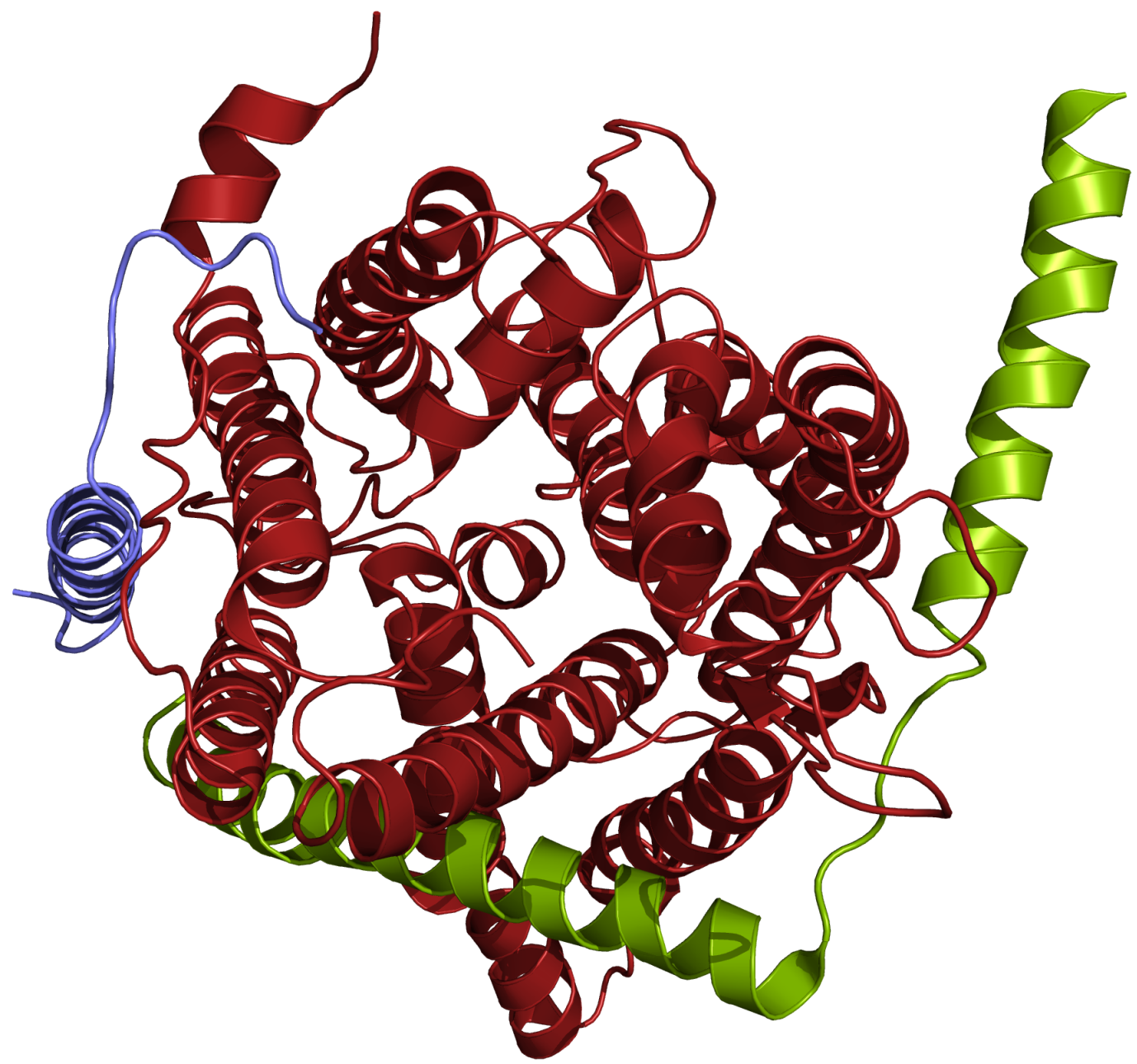
Top view (plugged channel)

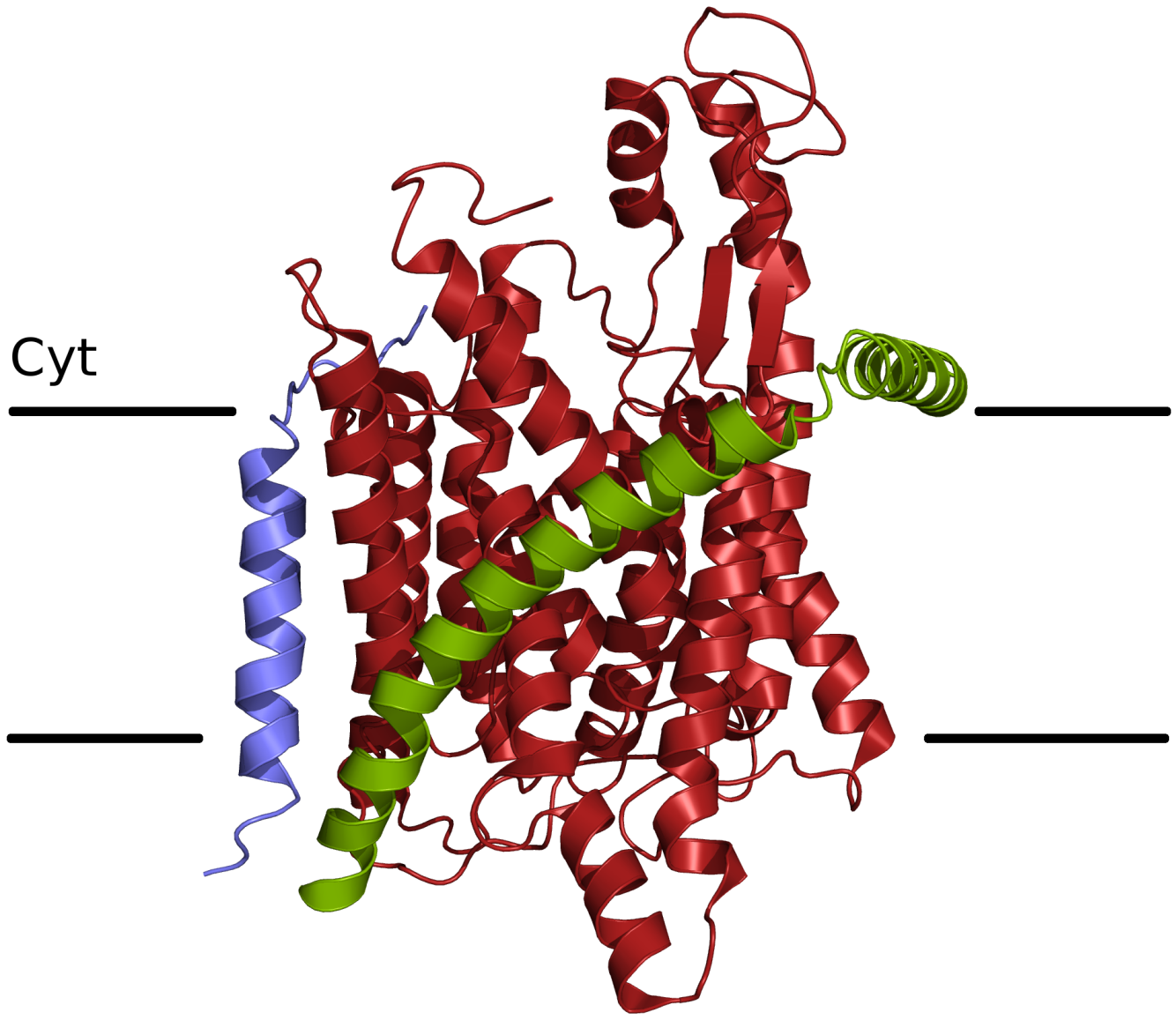
Side view (transmembrane)

Subunits: SecY (red), SecE (green), Secβ (blue)

Much of the knowledge on the structure of the SecY/Sec61α pore comes from an X-ray crystallography structure of its archaeal version. The large SecY subunit consists of two halves, trans-membrane segments 1-5 and trans-membrane segments 6-10. They are linked at the extracellular side by a loop between trans-membrane segments 5 and 6. SecY can open laterally at the front (lateral gate). SecE is a single spanning membrane protein in most species. It sits at the back of SecY, wrapping around the two halves of SecY. Secβ (SecG) is not essential. Its sits on the side of SecY and makes only few contacts with it. In a side view, the channel has an hourglass shape, with a cytoplasmic funnel that is empty, and an extracellular funnel that is filled with a little helix, called the plug. In the middle of the membrane is a construction, formed from a pore ring of four hydrophobic amino acids that project their side chains inwards. During protein translocation, the plug is moved out of the way, and a polypeptide chain is moved from the cytoplasmic funnel, through the pore ring, the extracellular funnel, into the extracellular space. Hydrophobic segments of membrane proteins exit sideways through the lateral gate into the lipid phase and become membrane-spanning segments.

SecG/Sec61β, archaeo-eukaryotic

Identifiers
- Symbol: Sec61_beta
- Pfam: PF03911
- InterPro: IPR016482
- SCOP2: 1rhz / SCOPe / SUPFAM
Available protein structures:
- PDB: IPR016482 PF03911 (ECOD; PDBsum)
- AlphaFold: IPR016482; PF03911

SecG, bacterial

Identifiers
- Symbol: SecG
- Pfam: PF03840
- InterPro: IPR004692
- OPM protein: 5aww
Available protein structures:
- PDB: IPR004692 PF03840 (ECOD; PDBsum)
- AlphaFold: IPR004692; PF03840

=== By taxon ===
The bacterial SecYEG channel interacts with the signal sequences of secretory proteins as well as SecA, an ATPase which drives translocation. SecY is an integral plasma membrane membrane protein of 419 to 492 amino acid residues that typically contains 10 transmembrane (TM), 6 cytoplasmic and 5 periplasmic regions.

Eukaryotic translocon uses BiP. The structure of human Sec61 is resolved at 3.84 Å by cryo-EM in 2020, together with the rest of the co-translational translocon including the ribosome.

The archaeal translocon is less understood. It might use SecDF-YajC and YidC like bacteria, as homologs have been found. An ATPase is yet to be identified.

== Species-specifics ==
Human proteins:

- SecY: SEC61A1, SEC61A2
- SecG: SEC61B
- SecE: SEC61G

Budding yeast have two such homologous complexes; the essential one is named Sec61, and the non-essential one is called Ssh1. Like Sec61, Ssh1 does dock to the ribosome.

== See also ==
- SecY protein
- Translocon
- Protein targeting
