= Streptomyces actinomycinicus =

Scientific classification
- Domain: Bacteria
- Kingdom: Bacillati
- Phylum: Actinomycetota
- Class: Actinomycetia
- Order: Streptomycetales
- Family: Streptomycetaceae
- Genus: Streptomyces
- Species: S. actinomycinicus

Binomial name
- Streptomyces actinomycinicus Tanasupawat et al. 2016

Type strain
- JCM 30864, PCU 342, RCU-197, TISTR 2208

Species of bacterium

Streptomyces actinomycinicus is a bacterium species from the genus Streptomyces which has been isolated from soil from a peat swamp forest in the Rayong Province in Thailand.

== See also ==
- List of Streptomyces species
