= SEC62 =

Protein-coding gene in the species Homo sapiens

Identifiers
- Aliases: SEC62, Dtrp1, HTP1, TLOC1, TP-1, SEC62 homolog, preprotein translocation factor
- External IDs: OMIM: 602173; MGI: 1916526; HomoloGene: 2449; GeneCards: SEC62; OMA:SEC62 - orthologs

Gene location (Human)
Chr.	Chromosome 3 (human)
Band	3q26.2	Start	169,966,635 bp
Band	3q26.2	End	169,998,373 bp

Gene location (Mouse)
Chr.	Chromosome 3 (mouse)
Band	3|3 A3	Start	30,847,024 bp
Band	3|3 A3	End	30,875,412 bp
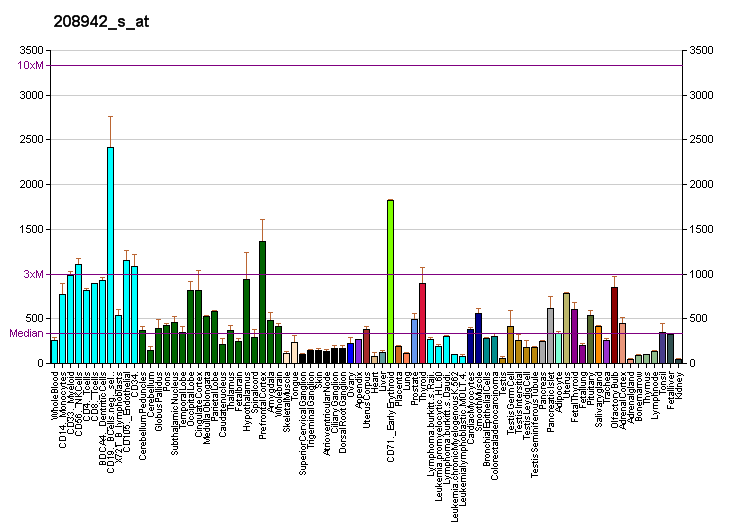

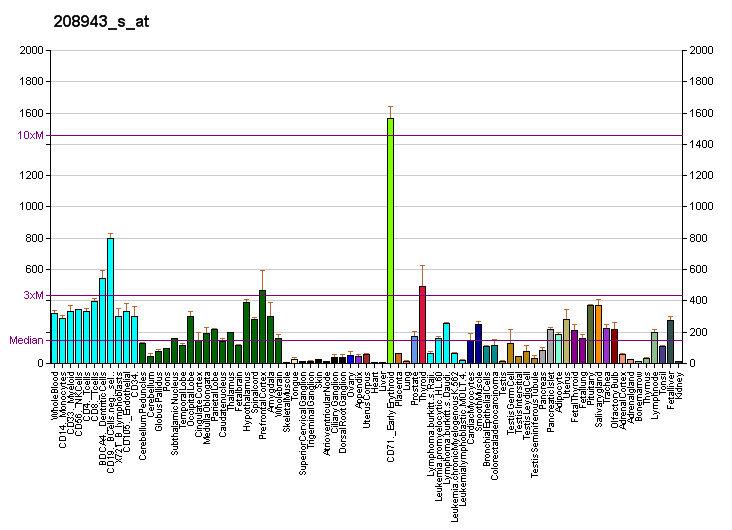
RNA expression pattern
Bgee	Human / Mouse (ortholog); Top expressed in: endothelial cell; superior vestibular nucleus; pons; parotid gland; inferior ganglion of vagus nerve; pars reticulata; Brodmann area 23; cardia; renal medulla; pars compacta / Top expressed in: saccule; otic placode; facial motor nucleus; seminal vesicula; lobe of prostate; lacrimal gland; anterior horn of spinal cord; epithelium of lens; parotid gland; supraoptic nucleus; More reference expression data
BioGPS	More reference expression data
Gene ontology
Molecular function	signaling receptor activity
Cellular component	integral component of membrane; cytosol; rough endoplasmic reticulum; endoplasmic reticulum membrane; membrane; endoplasmic reticulum; integral component of endoplasmic reticulum membrane
Biological process	protein transport; posttranslational protein targeting to endoplasmic reticulum membrane; cotranslational protein targeting to membrane; signal transduction; posttranslational protein targeting to membrane, translocation
Sources:Amigo / QuickGO
Orthologs
Species	Human	Mouse
Entrez	7095	69276
Ensembl	ENSG00000008952	ENSMUSG00000027706
UniProt	Q99442	Q8BU14
RefSeq (mRNA)	NM_003262	NM_027016; NM_001357528
RefSeq (protein)	NP_003253	NP_081292; NP_001344457
Location (UCSC)	Chr 3: 169.97 – 170 Mb	Chr 3: 30.85 – 30.88 Mb
PubMed search
- Wikidata
View/Edit Human	View/Edit Mouse

Translocation protein SEC62 is a protein that in humans is encoded by the SEC62 gene.

== Function ==
The Sec61 complex is the central component of the protein translocation apparatus of the endoplasmic reticulum (ER) membrane. The protein encoded by this gene and SEC63 protein are found to be associated with ribosome-free SEC61 complex. It is speculated that Sec61-Sec62-Sec63 may perform post-translational protein translocation into the ER. The Sec61-Sec62-Sec63 complex might also perform the backward transport of ER proteins that are subject to the ubiquitin-proteasome-dependent degradation pathway. The encoded protein is an integral membrane protein located in the rough ER.
