= UBL4A =

Protein-coding gene in the species Homo sapiens

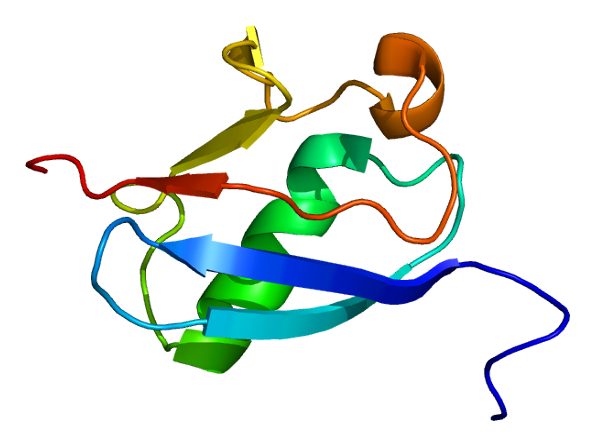

Identifiers
- Aliases: UBL4A, DX254E, DXS254E, G6PD, GDX, GET5, MDY2, TMA24, UBL4, ubiquitin like 4A
- External IDs: OMIM: 312070; MGI: 95049; GeneCards: UBL4A
Available structures
| PDB | Ortholog search: PDBe RCSB |
| PDB | List of PDB id codes 2DZI, 4WWR, 4X86 |

Gene location (Human)
| Chr. | X chromosome (human) |
| Band | Xq28 | Start | 154,483,717 bp |
| Band | Xq28 | End | 154,486,615 bp |

Gene location (Mouse)
| Chr. | X chromosome (mouse) |
| Band | X A7.3|X 38.0 cM | Start | 73,409,324 bp |
| Band | X A7.3|X 38.0 cM | End | 73,416,824 bp |
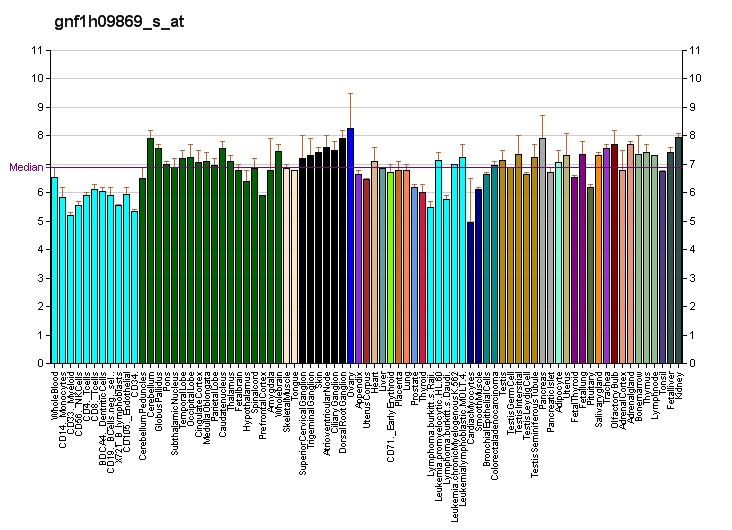

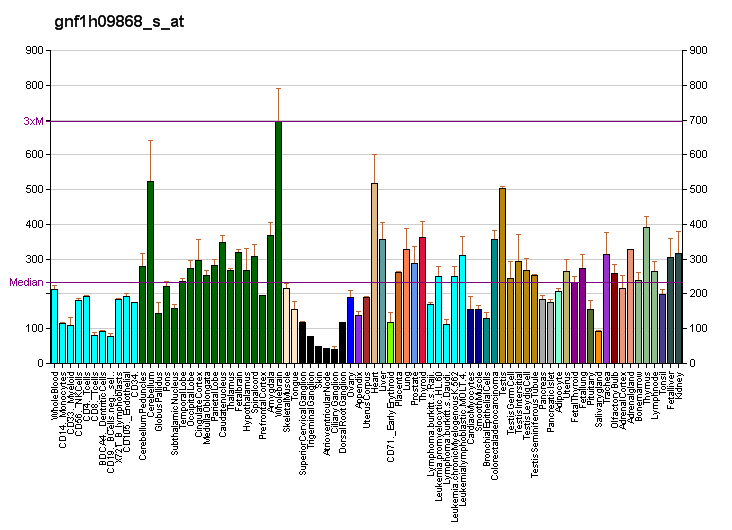

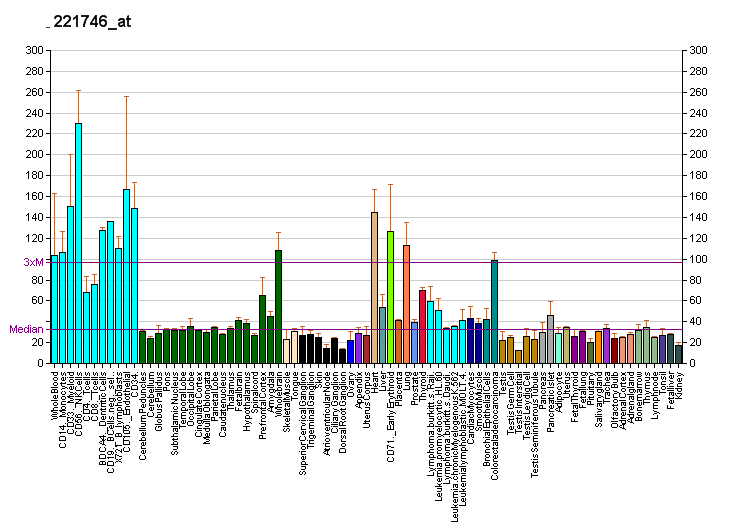
RNA expression pattern
| Bgee | Human / Mouse (ortholog); Top expressed in: muscle of thigh; apex of heart; gastrocnemius muscle; left ventricle; right frontal lobe; granulocyte; right auricle of heart; body of pancreas; Brodmann area 9; prefrontal cortex / Top expressed in: yolk sac; seminal vesicula; sternocleidomastoid muscle; digastric muscle; temporal muscle; vastus lateralis muscle; myocardium of ventricle; triceps brachii muscle; endocardial cushion; cardiac muscle tissue of left ventricle; More reference expression data |
| BioGPS | More reference expression data |
Gene ontology
| Molecular function | ubiquitin-like protein transferase activity; chaperone binding; protein binding |
| Cellular component | cytoplasm; cytosol; BAT3 complex; membrane; nucleus; nucleoplasm |
| Biological process | tail-anchored membrane protein insertion into ER membrane |
Sources:Amigo / QuickGO
Orthologs
| Databases | NCBI: entry; OMA: entry |
| Species | Human | Mouse |
| Entrez | 8266 | 27643 |
| Ensembl | ENSG00000102178 | ENSMUSG00000015290 |
| UniProt | P11441 | P21126 |
| RefSeq (mRNA) | NM_014235 | NM_145405 |
| RefSeq (protein) | NP_055050 | NP_663380; NP_001265200; NP_001265201 |
| Location (UCSC) | Chr X: 154.48 – 154.49 Mb | Chr X: 73.41 – 73.42 Mb |
| PubMed search |
- Wikidata
| View/Edit Human | View/Edit Mouse |

Ubiquitin-like protein 4A is a protein that in humans is encoded by the UBL4A gene.
