= SEC61B =

Mammalian protein found in Homo sapiens

Identifiers
- Aliases: SEC61B, Sec61 translocon beta subunit, SEC61 translocon subunit beta
- External IDs: OMIM: 609214; MGI: 1913462; GeneCards: SEC61B
Available structures
PDB	Ortholog search: PDBe RCSB
PDB	List of PDB id codes 2WWB, 4CG6

Gene location (Human)
Chr.	Chromosome 9 (human)
Band	9q22.33	Start	99,222,064 bp
Band	9q22.33	End	99,230,615 bp

Gene location (Mouse)
Chr.	Chromosome 4 (mouse)
Band	4|4 B1	Start	47,474,658 bp
Band	4|4 B1	End	47,483,242 bp
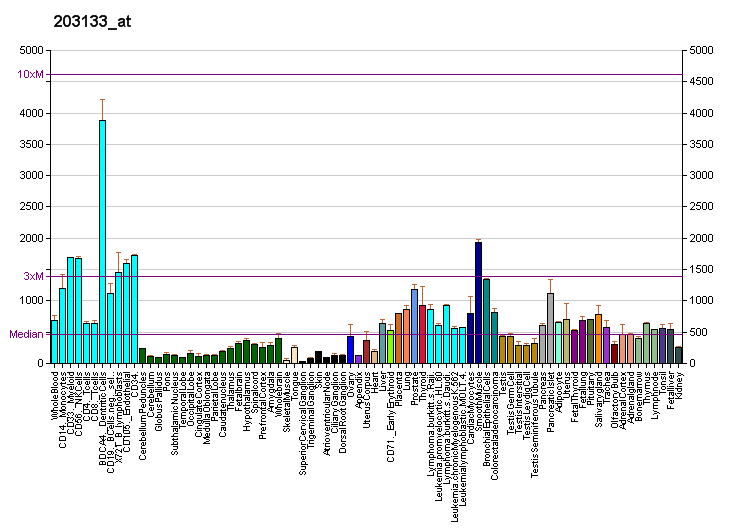
RNA expression pattern
Bgee	Human / Mouse (ortholog); Top expressed in: parotid gland; body of pancreas; oocyte; corpus epididymis; pylorus; anterior pituitary; trachea; olfactory zone of nasal mucosa; beta cell; right lobe of liver / Top expressed in: parotid gland; seminal vesicula; submandibular gland; gastrula; islet of Langerhans; mandibular prominence; molar; maxillary prominence; somite; lacrimal gland; More reference expression data
BioGPS	More reference expression data
Gene ontology
Molecular function	epidermal growth factor binding; protein binding; RNA binding; protein-transporting ATPase activity
Cellular component	integral component of membrane; cytosol; membrane; Sec61; endoplasmic reticulum; endoplasmic reticulum membrane; endoplasmic reticulum Sec complex
Biological process	retrograde protein transport, ER to cytosol; IRE1-mediated unfolded protein response; ubiquitin-dependent ERAD pathway; protein transport; intracellular protein transport; SRP-dependent cotranslational protein targeting to membrane, translocation; posttranslational protein targeting to membrane, translocation; transport; regulation of molecular function
Sources:Amigo / QuickGO
Orthologs
Databases	NCBI: entry; OMA: entry
Species	Human	Mouse
Entrez	10952	66212
Ensembl	ENSG00000106803	ENSMUSG00000053317
UniProt	P60468	Q9CQS8
RefSeq (mRNA)	NM_006808	NM_024171
RefSeq (protein)	NP_006799	NP_077133
Location (UCSC)	Chr 9: 99.22 – 99.23 Mb	Chr 4: 47.47 – 47.48 Mb
PubMed search
- Wikidata
View/Edit Human	View/Edit Mouse

Protein transport protein Sec61 subunit beta is a protein that in humans is encoded by the SEC61B gene.

The Sec61 complex is the central component of the protein translocation apparatus of the endoplasmic reticulum (ER) membrane. The Sec61 complex forms a transmembrane channel where proteins are translocated across and integrated into the ER membrane. This complex consists of three membrane proteins- alpha, beta, and gamma. This gene encodes the beta-subunit protein. The Sec61 subunits are also observed in the post-ER compartment, suggesting that these proteins can escape the ER and recycle back. There is evidence for multiple polyadenylated sites for this transcript.
