= SEC61G =

Mammalian protein found in Homo sapiens

Identifiers
- Aliases: SEC61G, SSS1, Sec61 translocon gamma subunit, SEC61 translocon subunit gamma
- External IDs: OMIM: 609215; MGI: 1202066; GeneCards: SEC61G
Available structures
PDB	Ortholog search: PDBe RCSB
PDB	List of PDB id codes 2WWB, 3J7R, 4CG7, 3J7Q, 4CG5, 4CG6

Gene location (Human)
Chr.	Chromosome 7 (human)
Band	7p11.2	Start	54,752,250 bp
Band	7p11.2	End	54,759,974 bp

Gene location (Mouse)
Chr.	Chromosome 11 (mouse)
Band	11|11 A2	Start	16,500,530 bp
Band	11|11 A2	End	16,508,484 bp
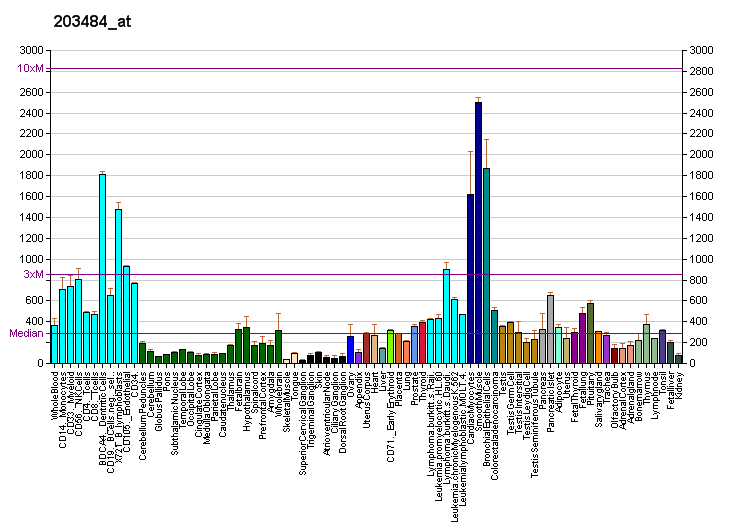
RNA expression pattern
Bgee	Human / Mouse (ortholog); Top expressed in: pituitary gland; body of pancreas; anterior pituitary; islet of Langerhans; mucosa of transverse colon; corpus epididymis; ganglionic eminence; cartilage tissue; tendon of biceps brachii; ventricular zone / Top expressed in: epiblast; primary oocyte; ileum; quadriceps femoris muscle; embryo; jejunum; bone marrow; embryo; neural tube; ventricular zone; More reference expression data
BioGPS	More reference expression data
Gene ontology
Molecular function	protein-transporting ATPase activity; protein binding; protein transmembrane transporter activity
Cellular component	integral component of membrane; cytosol; endoplasmic reticulum membrane; membrane; endoplasmic reticulum
Biological process	protein targeting; protein transmembrane transport; protein targeting to ER; protein transport; intracellular protein transport
Sources:Amigo / QuickGO
Orthologs
Databases	NCBI: entry; OMA: entry
Species	Human	Mouse
Entrez	23480	20335
Ensembl	ENSG00000132432	ENSMUSG00000078974
UniProt	P60059	P60060
RefSeq (mRNA)	NM_014302; NM_001012456	NM_001109971; NM_001109972; NM_011343
RefSeq (protein)	NP_001012474; NP_055117	NP_001103441; NP_001103442; NP_035473
Location (UCSC)	Chr 7: 54.75 – 54.76 Mb	Chr 11: 16.5 – 16.51 Mb
PubMed search
- Wikidata
View/Edit Human	View/Edit Mouse

Protein transport protein Sec61 subunit gamma is a protein that in humans is encoded by the SEC61G gene.

== Function ==
The Sec61 complex is the central component of the protein translocation apparatus of the endoplasmic reticulum (ER) membrane. The Sec61 complex forms a transmembrane channel where proteins are translocated across and integrated into the ER membrane. This complex consists of three membrane proteins- alpha, beta, and gamma. This gene encodes the gamma-subunit protein. Alternatively spliced transcript variants encoding the same protein have been identified.
