= PSORT =

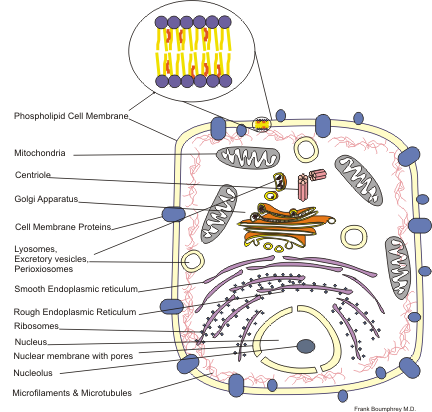
PSORT predicts where in a cell a protein will be sent to

PSORT is a bioinformatics tool used for the prediction of protein localisation sites in cells. It receives the information of an amino acid sequence and its taxon of origin (e.g. Gram-negative bacteria) as inputs. Then it analyses the input sequence by applying the stored rules for various sequence features of known protein sorting signals. Finally, it reports the possibility for the input protein to be localised at each candidate site with additional information.

Researchers using this tool can predict with some degree of reason, where in a cell a protein is most likely to localise to. This is because proteins are localised by cell machinery that recognises signal peptide sequences (similar to a postal address) and moves the protein the appropriate location. The signal peptide is often cleaved off after the destination is reached. PSORT uses known signal peptide sequences to analyse and predict what an input sequence is most likely to cause a localisation to.

Protein localisation is important because it supports a proposed role that a protein may have. For instance, catalase enzymes (proteins that convert peroxide into water and oxygen) should be expected to localise to a peroxisome because that is an area of high peroxide activity. By analysing a signal peptide sequence and visual localisation by GFP expression, strong evidence is obtained for this role.

The program was written by Dr Kenta Nakai from the Human Genome Center at the Institute for Medical Science, University of Tokyo, Japan and is available free for all users.

== External Reference ==
- PSORT website
