= Subcellular localization =

The cells of eukaryotic organisms are elaborately subdivided into functionally-distinct membrane-bound compartments. Some major constituents of eukaryotic cells are: extracellular space, plasma membrane, cytoplasm, nucleus, mitochondria, Golgi apparatus, endoplasmic reticulum (ER), peroxisome, vacuoles, cytoskeleton, nucleoplasm, nucleolus, nuclear matrix and ribosomes.

Bacteria also have subcellular localizations that can be separated when the cell is fractionated. The most common localizations referred to include the cytoplasm, the cytoplasmic membrane (also referred to as the inner membrane in Gram-negative bacteria), the cell wall (which is usually thicker in Gram-positive bacteria) and the extracellular environment. The cytoplasm, the cytoplasmic membrane and the cell wall are subcellular localizations, whereas the extracellular environment is clearly not. Most Gram-negative bacteria also contain an outer membrane and periplasmic space. Unlike eukaryotes, most bacteria contain no membrane-bound organelles, however there are some exceptions (i.e. magnetosomes).

== Protein Subcellular Location Databases ==
The experimentally determined subcellular locations of proteins can be found in UniProtKB, Compartments, and in a few more specialized resources, such as the lactic acid bacterial secretome database.

There are also several subcellular location databases with computational predictions, such as the fungal secretome and subcellular proteome knowledgebase - version 2 (FunSecKB2), the plant secretome and subcellular proteome knowledgebase (PlantSecKB), MetazSecKB for protein subcellular locations of human and animals, and ProtSecKB for protein subcellular locations of all protists.

Proteome Analyst is a freely available web server and online toolkit for predicting protein subcellular localization.

== See also ==
- Protein targeting
- Protein subcellular localization prediction.
