= GET4 =

Protein-coding gene in the species Homo sapiens

Identifiers
- Aliases: GET4, C7orf20, CEE, TRC35, CGI-20, golgi to ER traffic protein 4, guided entry of tail-anchored proteins factor 4
- External IDs: OMIM: 612056; MGI: 1914854; GeneCards: GET4

Gene location (Human)
Chr.	Chromosome 7 (human)
Band	7p22.3	Start	876,554 bp
Band	7p22.3	End	896,436 bp

Gene location (Mouse)
Chr.	Chromosome 5 (mouse)
Band	5|5 G2	Start	139,238,079 bp
Band	5|5 G2	End	139,255,806 bp
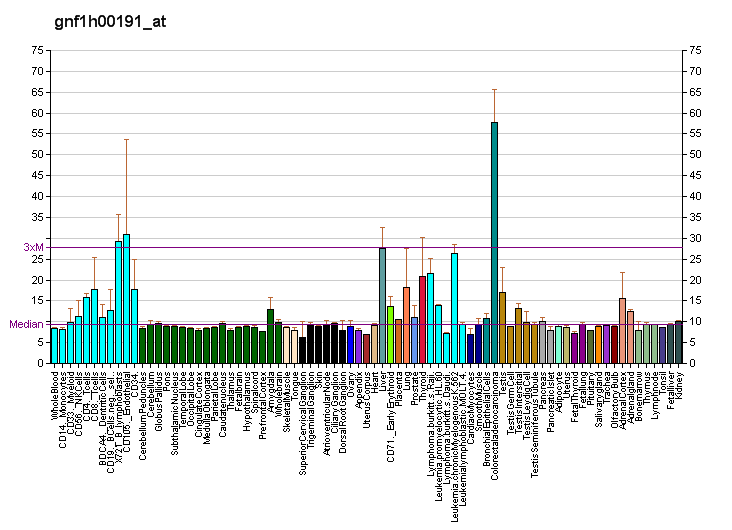
RNA expression pattern
Bgee	Human / Mouse (ortholog); Top expressed in: left testis; right testis; pituitary gland; right adrenal cortex; left adrenal cortex; right uterine tube; anterior pituitary; right lobe of liver; skin of leg; skin of abdomen / Top expressed in: bone marrow; yolk sac; epiblast; layer of retina; neural layer of retina; proximal tubule; neural tube; adrenal gland; limb; lip; More reference expression data
BioGPS	More reference expression data
Gene ontology
Molecular function	protein binding; chaperone binding
Cellular component	BAT3 complex; cytosol; cytoplasm; nucleoplasm; nucleolus
Biological process	cytoplasmic sequestering of protein; tail-anchored membrane protein insertion into ER membrane; maintenance of unfolded protein involved in ERAD pathway; protein insertion into ER membrane
Sources:Amigo / QuickGO
Orthologs
Databases	NCBI: entry; OMA: entry
Species	Human	Mouse
Entrez	51608	67604
Ensembl	ENSG00000239857	ENSMUSG00000025858
UniProt	Q7L5D6	Q9D1H7
RefSeq (mRNA)	NM_015949	NM_001163316; NM_026269; NM_001359238
RefSeq (protein)	NP_057033	NP_001156788; NP_080545; NP_001346167
Location (UCSC)	Chr 7: 0.88 – 0.9 Mb	Chr 5: 139.24 – 139.26 Mb
PubMed search
- Wikidata
View/Edit Human	View/Edit Mouse

GET4 is a protein that in humans is encoded by the GET4 gene.
