= Sec61 alpha 1 =

SEC61A1

Identifiers
- Aliases: SEC61A1, HSEC61, SEC61, SEC61A, Sec61 alpha 1, Sec61 translocon alpha 1 subunit, HNFJ4, SEC61 translocon subunit alpha 1, ADTKD5
- External IDs: OMIM: 609213; MGI: 1858417; GeneCards: SEC61A1

Gene location (Human)
Chr.	Chromosome 3 (human)
Band	3q21.3	Start	128,051,641 bp
Band	3q21.3	End	128,071,683 bp

Gene location (Mouse)
Chr.	Chromosome 6 (mouse)
Band	6|6 D1	Start	88,480,561 bp
Band	6|6 D1	End	88,495,887 bp
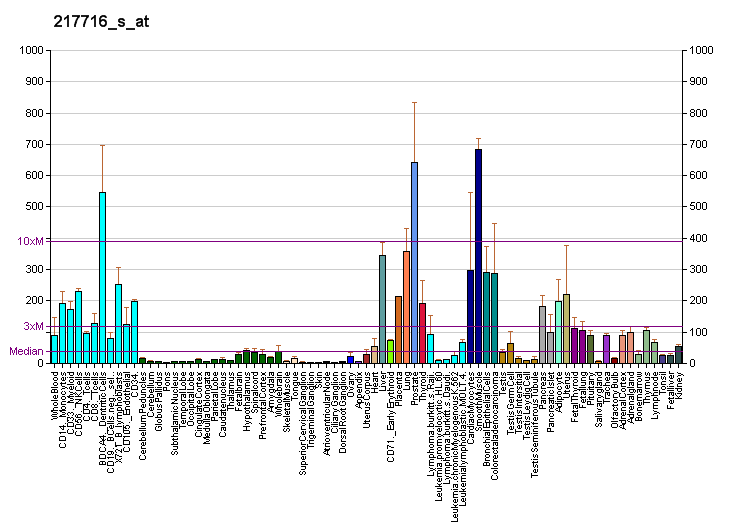
RNA expression pattern
Bgee	Human / Mouse (ortholog); Top expressed in: body of pancreas; stromal cell of endometrium; islet of Langerhans; anterior pituitary; right lobe of liver; smooth muscle tissue; body of stomach; left adrenal gland; upper lobe of left lung; left adrenal cortex / Top expressed in: internal carotid artery; Ileal epithelium; external carotid artery; Paneth cell; utricle; ascending aorta; seminal vesicula; crypt of lieberkuhn of small intestine; lacrimal gland; aortic valve; More reference expression data
BioGPS	More reference expression data
Gene ontology
Molecular function	protein binding; ribosome binding; signal sequence binding; protein transmembrane transporter activity; calcium channel activity
Cellular component	integral component of membrane; cytosol; rough endoplasmic reticulum; integral component of endoplasmic reticulum membrane; endoplasmic reticulum; membrane; endoplasmic reticulum membrane; Sec61
Biological process	response to interferon-gamma; endoplasmic reticulum organization; SRP-dependent cotranslational protein targeting to membrane; posttranslational protein targeting to endoplasmic reticulum membrane; protein targeting to ER; protein transport; pronephric nephron development; cotranslational protein targeting to membrane; SRP-dependent cotranslational protein targeting to membrane, translocation; posttranslational protein targeting to membrane, translocation; calcium ion transmembrane transport
Sources:Amigo / QuickGO
Orthologs
Databases	NCBI: entry; OMA: entry
Species	Human	Mouse
Entrez	29927	53421
Ensembl	ENSG00000058262	ENSMUSG00000030082
UniProt	P61619	P61620
RefSeq (mRNA)	NM_013336; NM_001400328; NM_001400329	NM_016906
RefSeq (protein)	NP_037468	NP_058602
Location (UCSC)	Chr 3: 128.05 – 128.07 Mb	Chr 6: 88.48 – 88.5 Mb
PubMed search
- Wikidata
View/Edit Human	View/Edit Mouse

Protein transport protein Sec61 subunit alpha isoform 1 is a protein encoded by the SEC61A1 gene in humans.

The protein encoded by this gene belongs to the SecY/Sec61α family. It plays a crucial role in the insertion of secretory and membrane polypeptides into the endoplasmic reticulum. This protein is found to be tightly associated with membrane-bound ribosomes, either directly or through adaptor proteins. This gene encodes an alpha subunit of the heteromeric SEC61 complex, which contains beta and gamma subunits.
