= Translocon =

Protein complex for polypeptide membrane transport

The translocon (also called a translocator or translocation channel) is a general term for a protein channel in biological membranes that functions to move polypeptides across the membrane or insert them into the lipid bilayer. This structure is a key component of the protein translocation pathway in all organisms, from bacteria, archaea, and eukaryotes.

In eukaryotes the term translocon most commonly refers to the complex that transports nascent polypeptides with a targeting signal sequence from the cytosol into the interior (cisternal or lumenal) space of the endoplasmic reticulum (ER). This translocation process requires the protein to cross a hydrophobic lipid bilayer. In prokaryotes, a similar protein complex transports polypeptides across the (inner) plasma membrane or integrates membrane proteins. In either case, the protein complex is formed from Sec proteins (Sec: secretory), with the hetero-trimeric Sec61 being the channel. In prokaryotes, the homologous channel complex is known as SecYEG.

== Structure and component ==
The translocon typically consists of integral membrane proteins that form a narrow channel, just wide enough for an unfolded polypeptide chain to pass through. The core structure of the translocon varies depending on the system:

- Sec System
  - Prokaryotes: SecYEG complex
  - Eukaryotes: Sec61αβγ complex
- TAT System (Twin-Arginine Translocation)
  - TatA, TatB, TatC complex, specialized for fully folded proteins
- YidC System
  - Inserts membrane proteins without passing through the Sec pathway

Translocons often have a “lateral gate” that allows hydrophobic segments (transmembrane domains) to exit directly into the lipid bilayer.

=== Central channel ===
The structure of this channel in its inactive state has been determined in archaea using X-ray crystallography.

In cells, the translocon channel is a three-part protein complex known as SecYEG in prokaryotes and Sec61 in eukaryotes. It is made up of the subunits SecY, SecE, and SecG, with SecY forming the main pore. The structure of this channel, in its idle state, has been solved by X-ray crystallography in archaea.

In some cases, the core trimer joins with four additional proteins to form a larger seven-part (heptameric) complex, which is responsible for transporting certain polypeptides into the endoplasmic reticulum (ER).

The channel has a distinctive hourglass shape when viewed from the side, with a funnel at both ends. The funnel facing outside the cell or organelle is closed by a small “plug” made of an alpha-helix. In the middle of the membrane is a ring of six hydrophobic amino acids whose side chains point inward, forming a selective barrier. When protein translocation begins, the plug moves aside, and the new polypeptide chain passes from the cytoplasmic funnel, through the pore ring, and out through the opposite funnel. For membrane proteins, hydrophobic regions exit through a side opening called the lateral gate, entering the surrounding lipid layer and becoming segments that span the membrane.

=== Associated protein ===
In bacteria, SecYEG forms a complex with SecDF, YajC and YidC. In eukaryotes, Sec61 forms a complex with the oligosaccharyl transferase complex, the TRAP complex, and the membrane protein TRAM (possible chaperone). For further components, such as signal peptidase complex and the SRP receptor it is not clear to what extent they only associate transiently to the translocon complex.

== Translocation mechanism ==
The translocon channel can let peptides move in either direction, so it needs additional components to push the peptide the right way. There are two main types of translocation: co-translational, which happens while the protein is still being made by the ribosome, and post-translational, which takes place after the protein is completed. Both processes occur in eukaryotes and bacteria, but the mechanisms differ. In eukaryotes, proteins are moved with the help of BiP and other transport complexes, while in bacteria, the SecA ATPase provides the energy to push the peptide through the channel.

=== Co-translational translocation ===
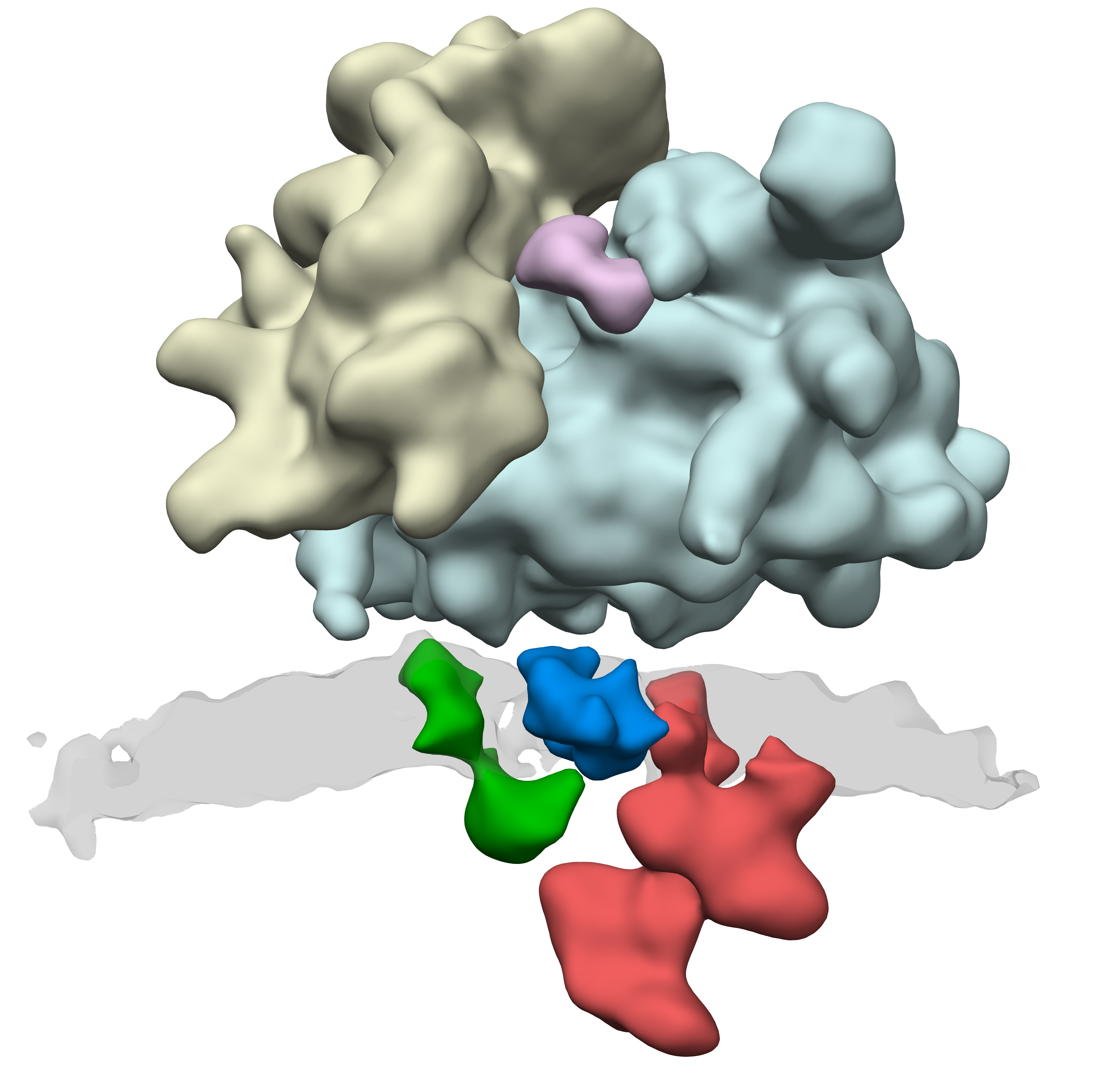
ER translocon complex. Many protein complexes are involved in protein synthesis. The actual production takes place in the ribosomes (yellow and light blue). Through the ER translocon (green: Sec61, blue: TRAP complex, and red: oligosaccharyl transferase complex) the newly synthesized protein is transported across the membrane (gray) into the interior of the ER. Sec61 is the protein-conducting channel and the OST adds sugar moieties to the nascent protein.

In co-translational translocation, the translocon works together with the ribosome so that a growing protein chain moves directly from the ribosome into the translocon channel. In eukaryotes, this process begins when a signal recognition particle (SRP) identifies a short signal sequence at the start of the protein. The SRP pauses protein synthesis and directs the ribosome to the SRP receptor on the endoplasmic reticulum (ER). Once the ribosome is attached, the SRP is released, and protein synthesis resumes. The new protein is threaded through the Sec61 channel in an unfolded form, sometimes with the help of a mechanism known as a Brownian Ratchet. After the protein is fully made, a signal peptidase cuts off the short signal sequence, releasing the finished protein into the ER’s interior.

The ER translocon is a group of connected protein complexes, including Sec61 (the channel), the TRAP complex, and the oligosaccharyl transferase (OST) complex, which can attach sugar molecules to the new protein as it enters the ER.

Bacteria use a similar SRP system, along with a chaperone called YidC, which is comparable to the TRAM protein in eukaryotes.

The translocon can also insert membrane proteins into the ER membrane in the correct orientation. This depends on recognizing hydrophobic parts of the protein sequence that will become transmembrane helices. These helices are positioned by the translocon through a combination of stop-transfer and signal sequences, with the channel’s plug opening and closing to place them properly in the membrane.

=== Post-translational translocation ===
In eukaryotes, post-translational translocation relies on BiP and other helper complexes, including the SEC62/SEC63 protein complex embedded in the membrane. In this process, Sec63 assists BiP in breaking down ATP, which gives BiP the energy to bind to the new protein and “pull” it through the channel. This pulling action is repeated by multiple BiP molecules until the entire protein is inside the target compartment.

In bacteria, a similar job is done by SecA, an ATP-powered “pushing” motor, sometimes helped by the SecDF complex on the opposite side, which can pull the protein through. SecA uses a “push-and-slide” mechanism: when bound to ATP, it uses a two-helix finger structure to push a section of the protein into the channel. After ATP is broken down into ADP, SecA releases its grip, allowing the protein to slide slightly in either direction. SecA then grabs the next section of the protein and repeats the cycle until the whole chain has passed through.

== The ER-retrotranslocon ==
Translocators can also move polypeptides (such as damaged proteins targeted for proteasomes) from the cisternal space of the endoplasmic reticulum to the cytosol. ER-proteins are degraded in the cytosol by the 26S proteasome, a process known as endoplasmic-reticulum-associated protein degradation, and therefore have to be transported by an appropriate channel. This retrotranslocon is still enigmatic.

It was initially believed that the Sec61 channel is responsible for this retrograde transport, implying that transport through Sec61 is not always unidirectional but also can be bidirectional. However, the structure of Sec61 does not support this view and several different proteins have been suggested to be responsible for transport from the ER lumen into the cytosol.

== Translocon quality control ==
Translocons can be clogged by translationally stalled or improperly folded proteins engaging with the complex. This is one of the ways translocons can become dysfunctional; for example in co-translational translocation (CTT), translocon clogging can occur due to translationally stalled ER-targeted proteins. Translocon clogging during post-translational translocation (PTT) may happen when proteins are not properly folded or form aggregates before they are fully translocated.

Translocon quality control mechanisms in the cell restore translocon function by relieving clogged translocon channels during protein translocation. The ubiquitin proteasome system (UPS) is one of multiple degradation mechanisms under TQC. The process includes clogged protein targeting by the attachment of ubiquitin enzymes for degradation by the proteasome.

== See also ==
- SecY protein
- Sec61
- Protein targeting
- Bacterial secretion system
