= SecA =

Bacterial protein

Identifiers
- Symbol: SecA
- Pfam: PF07517
Available protein structures:
- PDB: 3DIN PF07517 (ECOD; PDBsum)
- AlphaFold: PF07517

The SecA protein is a cell membrane associated subunit of the bacterial Sec or Type II secretory pathway, a system which is responsible for the secretion of proteins through the cell membrane. Within this system the SecA ATPase forms a translocase complex with the SecYEG channel, thereby driving the movement of the protein substrate across the membrane.

== Structure ==
SecA is a complex protein whose structure consists of six characterized domains that can explain SecA's capabilities to bind substrates and to move them. The following five domains seem to be present in all SecA proteins that have been structurally analyzed so far.

=== DEAD motor domain ===
This amino acid domain is subdivided into the two nucleotide binding folds 1 and 2 (NBF1 and NBF2) where ATP is bound and hydrolyzed. The chemical energy from the phosphodiester bonds results in a conformational change which is transferred to other domains (especially the HWD and the PPXD domains) which consequently mechanically move the preprotein across the membrane. However, these conformational changes are partly regulated by other protomer domains described below.

=== C-terminal linker domain ===
The capability to bind to the SecB chaperone during post-translational translocation, the ribosome (during both post-translational translocation and co-translational translocation) and the phospholipid bilayer is important for SecA functioning and is achieved by the C-terminal linker domain.

=== Helical wing domain (HWD) ===
Located at the C-terminal portion of the molecule, this domain is in contact with the HSD and PPXD domains. Likely it plays a role in transferring molecular conformational motion, which it receives from HSD and which originates from ATP hydrolysis in the DEAD motor domain, to the PPXD domain.

=== Peptide cross linking domain (PPXD) ===
Since SecA's essential function is the transport of preprotein across the membrane the ability to actually bind preprotein must be given. The PPXD domain fulfils this function upon substrate binding.

=== Helical scaffold domain (HSD) ===
This domain lies in the center of the SecA protomer and contacts via α-helical interactions all other subdomains. In addition it contains the intramolecular regulator of ATP hydrolysis 1 (IRA1) subdomain which seems to prevent unwanted ATP hydrolysis when SecA is not bound to SecYEG. Together with IRA1, a conserved salt bridge called Gate 1 might function to prevent unnecessary conformational change. Gate 1 seems to functionally connect the nucleotide (ATP) binding site of the DEAD motor domain with the PPXD domain which results in regulation of ATP hydrolysis only upon preprotein binding. However, this coordinative behaviour has only been shown to occur when SecA is bound to SecYEG.
