= Lysine desert =

Protein region lacking lysines

A lysine desert is an extended lysine-free region of a protein. Because lysine side chains are common sites of ubiquitin attachment and related protein modifications, lysine deserts have been studied in the context of ubiquitination, pupylation and proteasome-dependent protein degradation.

The term lysine desert was introduced by Sharma and colleagues in a study of a lysine-free region in the yeast SUMO-targeted ubiquitin ligase complex Slx5-Slx8.

== Biological significance ==
Early sequence comparisons showed substantial differences in the use of arginine and lysine between the receptor-binding and catalytic components of several AB toxins, with some catalytic components containing very few lysines. Hazes and Read subsequently proposed that several of these toxins enter cells, travel to the endoplasmic reticulum, and exploit endoplasmic reticulum-associated degradation, a pathway that moves misfolded proteins into the cytosol for degradation. They suggested that the low lysine content of the catalytic A chains could help some AB toxins escape ubiquitin-mediated degradation after reaching the cytosol.

Experimental studies provided indirect support for this hypothesis. Introducing lysines into the catalytic components of ricin, abrin, cholera toxin and pertussis toxin reduced their cellular toxicity, with proteasome inhibition alleviating these effects. These findings suggest that low lysine content can help some toxins avoid degradation after entering the cytosol from the endoplasmic reticulum, although ubiquitin attachment to the toxin variants was not directly demonstrated.

A related mechanism was described in the yeast quality-control ubiquitin ligase San1, which targets misfolded nuclear proteins for proteasomal degradation. San1 contains intrinsically disordered substrate-binding regions that lack lysine residues. Introducing single lysines into these regions was sufficient to destabilize San1, supporting the idea that local lysine depletion protects this protein from self-ubiquitination and degradation. A later bioinformatic analysis found San1-like features in several yeast and human ubiquitin ligases, suggesting that lysine depletion may occur more broadly among proteins involved in the ubiquitin–proteasome pathway.

Another yeast example was described in Slx5, a subunit of the Slx5-Slx8 SUMO-targeted ubiquitin ligase complex. Introducing lysines into an extended lysine-free region increased Slx5 self-ubiquitination in vitro and reduced its abundance in cells. Proteasome inhibition alleviated this reduction, supporting the idea that lysine deserts can protect ubiquitin ligases from excessive degradation. Lysine depletion was also explored in the yeast ubiquitin ligase Hrd1, which contains two flexible regions lacking lysine and cysteine. The incorporation of either amino acid at specific sites decreased Hrd1 levels and impaired its function. One of the introduced lysines was demonstrated to be a direct site of ubiquitin conjugation.

Studies of human proteins examined lysine deserts in six components of the ubiquitin–proteasome system: RAD23A, UBQLN1, UBQLN2, BAG6, RNF115 and PSMF1. Introducing lysines increased ubiquitination in five of these proteins; the single tested PSMF1 substitution had no detectable effect. In RAD23A and UBQLN1, introduced lysines were directly identified as sites of ubiquitin attachment. UBQLN1 and BAG6 variants showed proteasome-sensitive reductions in abundance, whereas RAD23A abundance was largely unchanged despite impaired function in a yeast assay. A follow-up study showed that introducing lysines into UBQLN2 increased its ubiquitination and reduced its abundance. Proteasome inhibition or loss of the ubiquitin ligase E6AP increased the abundance of this variant, supporting a protective role for the lysine-depleted region.

Studies of the human cullin-RING ubiquitin ligase substrate receptors VHL and SOCS1, which naturally contain three lysines and one lysine, respectively, found contrasting responses to lysine introduction. Adding lysines to VHL reduced its stability, whereas adding lysines to SOCS1 did not detectably alter its stability. Engineered lysine-free versions of both proteins still underwent proteasomal degradation, but inhibition of ubiquitin activation stabilized only VHL. Both lysine-free variants also produced ubiquitin-proximity signals comparable to those of the wild-type proteins, consistent with possible non-lysine ubiquitination.

In the nematode Caenorhabditis elegans, lysine deserts have been studied in EEL-1, a ubiquitin ligase orthologous to human HUWE1. Introducing lysines at selected positions reduced EEL-1 abundance and impaired protein degradation in worms with reduced proteasome capacity. These mutations also increased the occurrence of vulval rupture, linking lysine depletion to a physiological effect in a multicellular organism. Disabling ubiquitin ligase activity of EEL-1 restored the abundance of one tested lysine variant, suggesting that self-ubiquitination contributed to its loss.

Beyond these individual examples, comparisons of yeast, worm, fly, mouse and human proteins have revealed lysine deserts in a range of eukaryotes, with a higher prevalence in the examined mammalian proteomes. Many proteins also combined an extended lysine-free region with a short region clustering most of their remaining lysines.

Outside eukaryotes, lysine deserts have also been reported in bacteria with pupylation-dependent proteasomal degradation systems, including Mycobacterium tuberculosis and Mycolicibacterium smegmatis, as well as in mycobacteriophages. These observations raise the possibility that lysine depletion limits attachment of the bacterial ubiquitin-like modifier Pup, although this has not been experimentally established.
