= Ubiquitin C =

Mammalian protein found in humans

UBC
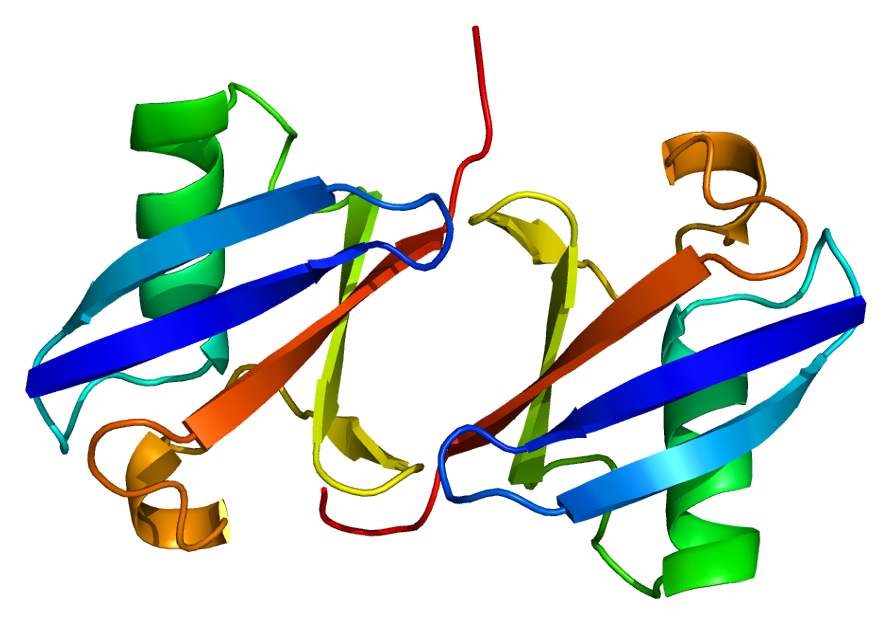

Identifiers
- Aliases: UBC, HMG20, Ubiquitin C
- External IDs: OMIM: 191340; MGI: 98889; GeneCards: UBC
Available structures
PDB	Ortholog search: PDBe RCSB
PDB	List of PDB id codes 1C3T, 1CMX, 1D3Z, 1F9J, 1FXT, 1G6J, 1GJZ, 1NBF, 1OGW, 1Q5W, 1S1Q, 1SIF, 1TBE, 1UBI, 1UBQ, 1UD7, 1XD3, 1XQQ, 1YX5, 1YX6, 1ZGU, 2AYO, 2BGF, 2DEN, 2FUH, 2G45, 2GBJ, 2GBK, 2GBM, 2GBN, 2GBR, 2GMI, 2HTH, 2IBI, 2J7Q, 2JF5, 2JRI, 2JY6, 2JZZ, 2K25, 2K6D, 2K8B, 2K8C, 2KDF, 2KJH, 2KLG, 2KN5, 2KX0, 2L3Z, 2LD9, 2LVO, 2LVP, 2LVQ, 2LZ6, 2MBO, 2MBQ, 2MCN, 2MI8, 2MJ5, 2MOR, 2MRE, 2MWS, 2N2K, 2NR2, 2O6V, 2OJR, 2PE9, 2PEA, 2RR9, 2RU6, 2W9N, 2WDT, 2XEW, 2Z59, 2ZCB, 2ZVN, 2ZVO, 3A33, 3ALB, 3AUL, 3B08, 3B0A, 3BY4, 3C0R, 3DVG, 3DVN, 3EEC, 3EFU, 3EHV, 3H7P, 3H7S, 3HM3, 3IFW, 3IHP, 3JSV, 3JVZ, 3JW0, 3K9O, 3K9P, 3KVF, 3KW5, 3LDZ, 3MHS, 3MTN, 3N30, 3N32, 3N3K, 3NS8, 3O65, 3OFI, 3OJ4, 3ONS, 3PRM, 3PT2, 3PTF, 3Q3F, 3RUL, 3TMP, 3U30, 3UGB, 3V6C, 3V6E, 3VFK, 3VUW, 3VUX, 3VUY, 3WXE, 3WXF, 3ZNI, 3ZNZ, 4AUQ, 4BOS, 4BOZ, 4BVU, 4DDG, 4DDI, 4DHJ, 4DHZ, 4FJV, 4HK2, 4HXD, 4I6L, 4I6N, 4IG7, 4IUM, 4JQW, 4K1R, 4K7S, 4K7U, 4K7W, 4KSK, 4KSL, 4LCD, 4LDT, 4MDK, 4MM3, 4MSM, 4MSQ, 4NQK, 4UN2, 4V3K, 4V3L, 5AIU, 4XOK, 5AF6, 5AF5, 5AF4, 4XOL, 5C7J, 5C7M, 5E6J, 4ZQS, 4AP4,%%s4AP4

Gene location (Human)
Chr.	Chromosome 12 (human)
Band	12q24.31	Start	124,911,604 bp
Band	12q24.31	End	124,917,368 bp

Gene location (Mouse)
Chr.	Chromosome 5 (mouse)
Band	5 G1.1|5 64.18 cM	Start	125,463,029 bp
Band	5 G1.1|5 64.18 cM	End	125,467,266 bp
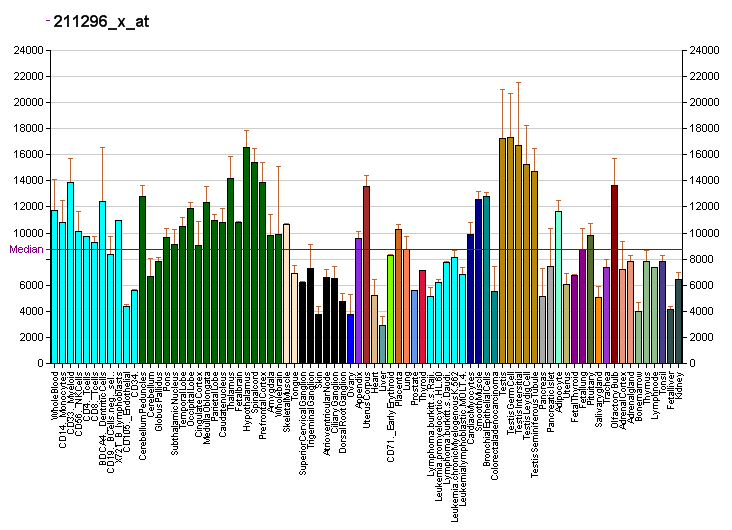

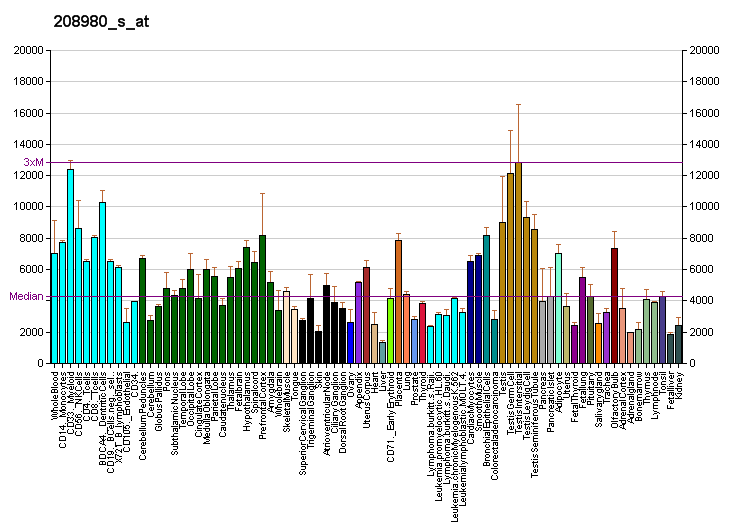
RNA expression pattern
Bgee	Human / Mouse (ortholog); Top expressed in: olfactory bulb; Brodmann area 46; pericardium; vena cava; cerebellar vermis; postcentral gyrus; spinal ganglia; trigeminal ganglion; lateral nuclear group of thalamus; frontal pole / Top expressed in: granulocyte; right kidney; endothelial cell of lymphatic vessel; temporal muscle; dentate gyrus of hippocampal formation granule cell; muscle of thigh; triceps brachii muscle; central gray substance of midbrain; sternocleidomastoid muscle; calvaria; More reference expression data
BioGPS	More reference expression data
Gene ontology
Molecular function	protease binding; protein binding; RNA binding; protein tag; ubiquitin protein ligase binding
Cellular component	cytoplasm; endocytic vesicle membrane; cytosol; nucleus; extracellular exosome; plasma membrane; nucleoplasm; endosome membrane; extracellular space; mitochondrial outer membrane; endoplasmic reticulum quality control compartment; vesicle; endoplasmic reticulum membrane; host cell
Biological process	DNA damage response, signal transduction by p53 class mediator resulting in cell cycle arrest; negative regulation of epidermal growth factor receptor signaling pathway; interstrand cross-link repair; nucleotide-excision repair, DNA damage recognition; positive regulation of canonical Wnt signaling pathway; tumor necrosis factor-mediated signaling pathway; regulation of type I interferon production; TRIF-dependent toll-like receptor signaling pathway; Fc-epsilon receptor signaling pathway; endosomal transport; global genome nucleotide-excision repair; NIK/NF-kappaB signaling; G2/M transition of mitotic cell cycle; stress-activated MAPK cascade; transforming growth factor beta receptor signaling pathway; macroautophagy; negative regulation of canonical Wnt signaling pathway; nucleotide-excision repair, DNA gap filling; error-free translesion synthesis; regulation of tumor necrosis factor-mediated signaling pathway; stimulatory C-type lectin receptor signaling pathway; negative regulation of transforming growth factor beta receptor signaling pathway; JNK cascade; regulation of transcription from RNA polymerase II promoter in response to hypoxia; nucleotide-excision repair, DNA incision; I-kappaB kinase/NF-kappaB signaling; innate immune response; Notch signaling pathway; regulation of mRNA stability; protein polyubiquitination; negative regulation of apoptotic process; negative regulation of transcription by RNA polymerase II; virion assembly; positive regulation of NF-kappaB transcription factor activity; anaphase-promoting complex-dependent catabolic process; negative regulation of type I interferon production; nucleotide-binding oligomerization domain containing signaling pathway; intracellular transport of virus; viral life cycle; MyD88-dependent toll-like receptor signaling pathway; error-prone translesion synthesis; MAPK cascade; fibroblast growth factor receptor signaling pathway; ion transmembrane transport; glycogen biosynthetic process; positive regulation of apoptotic process; positive regulation of I-kappaB kinase/NF-kappaB signaling; translesion synthesis; transcription-coupled nucleotide-excision repair; T cell receptor signaling pathway; MyD88-independent toll-like receptor signaling pathway; positive regulation of transcription by RNA polymerase II; nucleotide-excision repair, DNA incision, 5'-to lesion; Wnt signaling pathway; nucleotide-excision repair, DNA duplex unwinding; regulation of signal transduction by p53 class mediator; ERBB2 signaling pathway; nucleotide-excision repair, preincision complex assembly; Wnt signaling pathway, planar cell polarity pathway; proteasome-mediated ubiquitin-dependent protein catabolic process; positive regulation of epidermal growth factor receptor signaling pathway; protein folding; negative regulation of G2/M transition of mitotic cell cycle; protein ubiquitination; protein deubiquitination; SCF-dependent proteasomal ubiquitin-dependent protein catabolic process; entry of bacterium into host cell; transmembrane transport; regulation of necroptotic process; membrane organization; endoplasmic reticulum mannose trimming; cellular iron ion homeostasis; regulation of hematopoietic stem cell differentiation; protein targeting to peroxisome; cytokine-mediated signaling pathway; modification-dependent protein catabolic process; interleukin-1-mediated signaling pathway
Sources:Amigo / QuickGO
Orthologs
Databases	NCBI: entry; OMA: entry
Species	Human	Mouse
Entrez	7316	22190
Ensembl	ENSG00000150991	ENSMUSG00000008348
UniProt	P0CG48	P0CG50
RefSeq (mRNA)	NM_021009	NM_019639
RefSeq (protein)	NP_066289	NP_062613
Location (UCSC)	Chr 12: 124.91 – 124.92 Mb	Chr 5: 125.46 – 125.47 Mb
PubMed search
- Wikidata
View/Edit Human	View/Edit Mouse

Polyubiquitin-C is a protein encoded by the UBC gene in humans. Polyubiquitin-C is one of the sources of ubiquitin, along with UBB, UBA52, and RPS27A.

UBC gene is one of the two stress-regulated polyubiquitin genes (UBB and UBC) in mammals. It plays a key role in maintaining cellular ubiquitin levels under stress conditions. Defects of UBC gene could lead to mid-gestation embryonic lethality.

== Structure ==
=== Gene ===
UBC gene is located at chromosome 12q24.3, consisting of 2 exons. The promoter of the UBC gene contains putative heat shock elements (HSEs), which mediates UBC induction upon stress. UBC gene differs from UBB gene in the number of Ub coding units they contain. Nine to ten Ub units were in the UBC gene.

=== Protein ===
In polyubiquitin-C, the C-terminus of a given ubiquitin molecule is covalently conjugated to either the N-terminal residue or one of seven lysine residues of another ubiquitin molecule. Different linking of ubiquitin chains results in distinct conformations. There are 8 linkage types of polyubiquitin-C, and each type possesses the linkage-dependent dynamics and a linkage-specific conformation.

== Function ==
The diversity of polyubiquitin-C means that ubiquitylation contributes to the regulation of many cellular events. Polyubiquitin-C doesn't activate the heat-shock response, but it plays a key role in sustaining the response. UBC gene transcription is induced during stress and provides extra ubiquitin necessary to remove damaged/unfolded proteins. Polyubiquitin-C has important role in diverse biological processes, such as innate immunity, DNA repair and kinase activity. Unanchored polyubiquitin-C are also key signaling molecules that connect and coordinate the proteasome and autophagy to eliminate toxic protein aggregates.

== Clinical significance ==
Loss of a single UBC allele has no apparent phenotype, while homozygous deletion of UBC gene leads to mid-gestation embryonic lethality due to a defect in fetal liver development, as well as a delay in cell-cycle progression and increased susceptibility to cellular stress. It is also reported that homozygous deletion of UBC gene in mouse embryonic fibroblasts will cause decreased cellular Ub level and reduced viability under oxidative stress.

== Interactions ==
Polyubiquitin-C has been shown to interact with:

- BIRC2,
- BSG,
- CDC2,
- CFAP298,
- E2F1,
- EGFR,
- HDAC3,
- HIF1A,
- IRAK1,
- KIAA0753.
- MARK4,
- MDM2,
- NDUFA3,
- NFE2L2,
- NOTCH1,
- NUAK1,
- OPRK1,
- P53,
- PCNA
- PARK2,
- RIPK1,
- RPS6KB1,
- S100A10,
- SCNN1A,
- SCNN1G,
- SFPQ,
- SMAD3,
- SMURF2,
- SP1,
- TRAF6, and
- THRA.
