= 40S ribosomal protein S30 =

Human protein

FAU

Identifiers
- Aliases: FAU, FAU1, Fub1, Fubi, MNSFbeta, S30, asr1, Finkel-Biskis-Reilly murine sarcoma virus (FBR-MuSV) ubiquitously expressed, ubiquitin like and ribosomal protein S30 fusion, FAU ubiquitin like and ribosomal protein S30 fusion, RPS30
- External IDs: OMIM: 134690; MGI: 102547; GeneCards: FAU
Available structures
PDB	Ortholog search: PDBe RCSB
PDB	List of PDB id codes 2L7R,%%s4UG0, 4V6X, 5A2Q, 5AJ0, 5FLX

Gene location (Human)
Chr.	Chromosome 11 (human)
Band	11q13.1	Start	65,120,630 bp
Band	11q13.1	End	65,122,177 bp

Gene location (Mouse)
Chr.	Chromosome 19 (mouse)
Band	19 A|19 4.34 cM	Start	6,107,874 bp
Band	19 A|19 4.34 cM	End	6,109,554 bp
RNA expression pattern
Bgee	Human / Mouse (ortholog); Top expressed in: granulocyte; canal of the cervix; left ovary; monocyte; amygdala; right uterine tube; tibial arteries; muscle layer of sigmoid colon; bone marrow cell; right ovary / Top expressed in: spleen; thymus; urinary bladder; bone marrow; duodenum; embryo; embryo; granulocyte; jejunum; yolk sac; More reference expression data
BioGPS	n/a
Gene ontology
Molecular function	RNA binding; structural constituent of ribosome
Cellular component	cellular component; cytosol; ribosome; intracellular anatomical structure; cytosolic small ribosomal subunit; small ribosomal subunit; nucleoplasm; extracellular space
Biological process	biological process; viral transcription; SRP-dependent cotranslational protein targeting to membrane; innate immune response in mucosa; translational initiation; nuclear-transcribed mRNA catabolic process, nonsense-mediated decay; protein biosynthesis; rRNA processing; antimicrobial humoral immune response mediated by antimicrobial peptide
Sources:Amigo / QuickGO
Orthologs
Databases	NCBI: entry; OMA: entry
Species	Human	Mouse
Entrez	2197	14109
Ensembl	ENSG00000149806	ENSMUSG00000038274
UniProt	P35544; P62861	P35545; P62862
RefSeq (mRNA)	NM_001997	NM_001160239; NM_001190436; NM_007990
RefSeq (protein)	NP_001988	NP_001153711; NP_001177365; NP_032016
Location (UCSC)	Chr 11: 65.12 – 65.12 Mb	Chr 19: 6.11 – 6.11 Mb
PubMed search
- Wikidata
View/Edit Human	View/Edit Mouse

40S ribosomal protein S30 is a protein that in humans is encoded by the FAU gene.

== Function ==
This gene is the cellular homolog of the fox sequence in the Finkel-Biskis-Reilly murine sarcoma virus (FBR-MuSV). It encodes a fusion protein consisting of the ubiquitin-like protein FUBI at the N-terminus and ribosomal protein S30 at the C-terminus. It has been proposed that the fusion protein is post-translationally processed to generate free fubi and free ribosomal protein S30. Fubi is a member of the ubiquitin family, and ribosomal protein S30 belongs to the S30E family of ribosomal proteins. Whereas the function of fubi is currently unknown, ribosomal protein S30 is a component of the 40S subunit of the cytoplasmic ribosome. Pseudogenes derived from this gene are present in the genome. Similar to ribosomal protein S30, ribosomal proteins S27a and L40 are synthesized as fusion proteins with ubiquitin.
