= UBB+1 =

Protein

UBB+1 is shorthand for Ubiquitin-B+1, a frameshifted mutant arising from the Ubiquitin B gene.

UBB+1 is thought to arise from molecular misreading, a poorly understood process. Molecular misreading introduces dinucleotide deletions (e.g. ΔGA, ΔGU) into mRNA transcripts. These deletions are not present in genomic DNA. UBB+1 has been observed in the hallmarks of Alzheimer's disease, as well as other tauopathies and in polyglutamine diseases (e.g. Huntington's disease) but not in synucleinopathies (e.g. Parkinson's disease).

Since its discovery, it has been shown in vitro and in vivo that UBB+1 inhibits the proteasome and gives rise to downstream effects (e.g. a behavioral phenotype; impaired contextual memory). In non-neuronal cells UBB+1 also accumulates suggesting a functional role in non-neuronal diseases. UBB+1 can be truncated by yeast's ubiquitin hydrolase 1 (YUH1) and ubiquitin C-terminal hydrolase L3 UCHL3 even though the glycine at position 76 has been substituted for a tyrosine.
