= PSMF1 =

Protein found in humans

Available structures
PDB	Ortholog search: PDBe RCSB
PDB	List of PDB id codes 2VT8, 4OUH

Identifiers
- Aliases: PSMF1, PI31, proteasome inhibitor subunit 1
- External IDs: OMIM: 617858; MGI: 1346072; HomoloGene: 38231; GeneCards: PSMF1; OMA:PSMF1 - orthologs

Gene location (Human)
Chr.	Chromosome 20 (human)
Band	20p13	Start	1,113,240 bp
Band	20p13	End	1,189,415 bp

Gene location (Mouse)
Chr.	Chromosome 2 (mouse)
Band	2|2 G3	Start	151,557,732 bp
Band	2|2 G3	End	151,586,106 bp
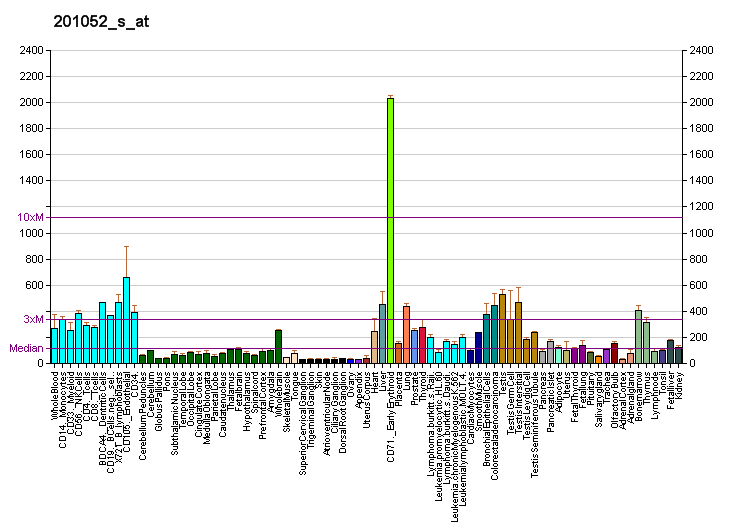

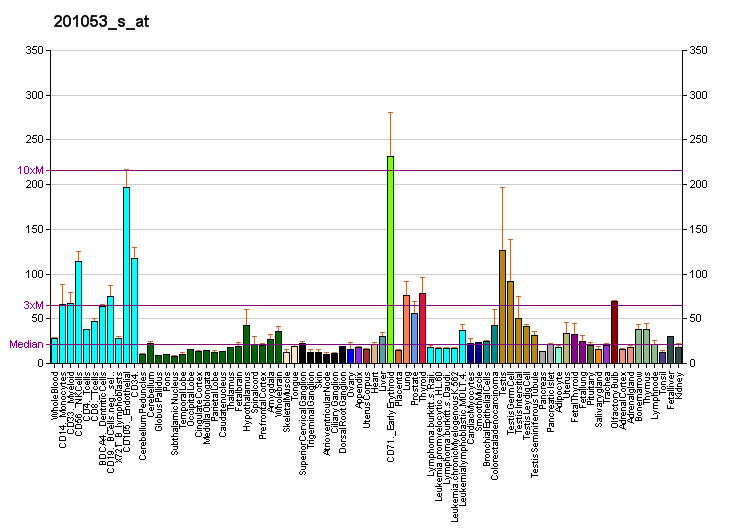
RNA expression pattern
Bgee	Human / Mouse (ortholog); Top expressed in: sperm; left testis; right testis; muscle of thigh; blood; gastrocnemius muscle; popliteal artery; tibial arteries; monocyte; islet of Langerhans / Top expressed in: seminiferous tubule; spermatid; secondary oocyte; zygote; primary oocyte; blood; sciatic nerve; interventricular septum; fetal liver hematopoietic progenitor cell; spermatocyte; More reference expression data
BioGPS	More reference expression data
Gene ontology
Molecular function	proteasome binding; protein binding; endopeptidase inhibitor activity; protein homodimerization activity; protein heterodimerization activity
Cellular component	cytoplasm; cytosol; membrane; nucleoplasm; endoplasmic reticulum; proteasome complex; proteasome core complex; perinuclear region of cytoplasm
Biological process	regulation of cellular amino acid metabolic process; antigen processing and presentation of exogenous peptide antigen via MHC class I, TAP-dependent; ubiquitin-dependent protein catabolic process; regulation of mRNA stability; positive regulation of canonical Wnt signaling pathway; protein polyubiquitination; stimulatory C-type lectin receptor signaling pathway; tumor necrosis factor-mediated signaling pathway; MAPK cascade; Fc-epsilon receptor signaling pathway; NIK/NF-kappaB signaling; negative regulation of proteasomal protein catabolic process; anaphase-promoting complex-dependent catabolic process; T cell receptor signaling pathway; negative regulation of canonical Wnt signaling pathway; proteasome-mediated ubiquitin-dependent protein catabolic process; Wnt signaling pathway, planar cell polarity pathway; negative regulation of endopeptidase activity; negative regulation of G2/M transition of mitotic cell cycle; protein deubiquitination; SCF-dependent proteasomal ubiquitin-dependent protein catabolic process; transmembrane transport; regulation of transcription from RNA polymerase II promoter in response to hypoxia; post-translational protein modification; regulation of hematopoietic stem cell differentiation; interleukin-1-mediated signaling pathway; regulation of mitotic cell cycle phase transition
Sources:Amigo / QuickGO
Orthologs
Species	Human	Mouse
Entrez	9491	228769
Ensembl	ENSG00000125818	ENSMUSG00000032869
UniProt	Q92530; Q5QPM9	Q8BHL8
RefSeq (mRNA)	NM_006814; NM_178578; NM_178579; NM_001323407; NM_001323408 NM_001323409; NM_001323410	NM_144889; NM_212446; NM_001305244
RefSeq (protein)	NP_001310336; NP_001310337; NP_001310338; NP_001310339; NP_006805 NP_848693	NP_001292173; NP_997611
Location (UCSC)	Chr 20: 1.11 – 1.19 Mb	Chr 2: 151.56 – 151.59 Mb
PubMed search
- Wikidata
View/Edit Human	View/Edit Mouse

Proteasome inhibitor PI31 subunit is a protein that in humans is encoded by the PSMF1 gene.

== Function ==
The 26S proteasome is a multicatalytic proteinase complex with a highly ordered structure consisting of two subcomplexes, a 20S core and a 19S regulator. The 20S core is made up of 4 rings of 28 non-identical subunits; 2 rings are composed of 7 alpha subunits and 2 rings are composed of 7 beta subunits. The 19S regulator is composed of a base, which contains 6 ATPase subunits and 2 non-ATPase subunits, and a lid, which contains up to 10 non-ATPase subunits. Proteasomes are distributed throughout eukaryotic cells at a high concentration and cleave peptides in an ATP/ubiquitin-dependent process in a non-lysosomal pathway. An essential function of a modified proteasome, the immunoproteasome, is the processing of class I MHC peptides. PSMF1 encodes a protein termed PI31 that binds to both 20S and 26S proteasomes. PI31 was originally identified by its ability to inhibit the hydrolysis of small synthetic peptides in a cell free assay, but it stimulates 26S proteasome activity both in vitro and in vivo. PI31 can promote the assembly of 26S proteasomes from 19S and 20S sub-particles, and it also serves as an adapter to couple proteasomes with motor proteins to mediate fast axonal transport in neurons. Inactivation of PMSF1 in yeast, plants, fruit flies and mice attenuates protein degradation and stimulates accumulation of ubiquitinated protein aggregates. Furthermore, loss of PSMF1 function in mice causes progressive neuronal dysfunction, synaptic degeneration and eventually neuronal cell death. Alternative transcript variants have been identified for this gene.
