= KIAA0753 =

Identifiers
- Aliases: KIAA0753, MNR, OFIP, SRTD21, JBTS38
- External IDs: OMIM: 617112; MGI: 1921727; GeneCards: KIAA0753

Gene location (Human)
Chr.	Chromosome 17 (human)
Band	17p13.1	Start	6,578,147 bp
Band	17p13.1	End	6,640,711 bp
RNA expression pattern
Bgee	Human / Mouse (ortholog); Top expressed in: external globus pallidus; ventricular zone; right testis; secondary oocyte; left testis; epithelium of bronchus; mucosa of paranasal sinus; male germ cell; right uterine tube; cardia / n/a; More reference expression data
BioGPS	n/a
Gene ontology
Molecular function	protein binding
Cellular component	centrosome; centriolar satellite; cytoskeleton; microtubule organizing center; cytoplasm; centriole; cytosol
Biological process	protein localization to centrosome; centriole replication
Sources:Amigo / QuickGO
Orthologs
Databases	NCBI: entry; OMA: entry
Species	Human	Mouse
Entrez	9851	74477
Ensembl	ENSG00000198920	n/a
UniProt	Q2KHM9	Q6A000
RefSeq (mRNA)	NM_014804; NM_001351225	NM_028963; NM_001361564
RefSeq (protein)	NP_055619; NP_001338154	NP_083239; NP_001348493
Location (UCSC)	Chr 17: 6.58 – 6.64 Mb	n/a
PubMed search
- Wikidata
View/Edit Human	View/Edit Mouse

KIAA0753 is a protein that in humans is encoded by the gene KIAA0753. The gene is located on chromosome 17p13.1, on the reverse strand spanning bases 6578141 to 6641744. The KIAA0753 gene contains 18 exons, 19 introns (in humans), and has no known aliases.

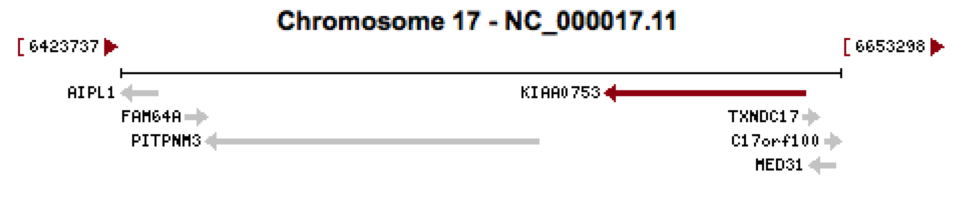
Diagram of human chromosome 17 with KIAA0753 location indicated

== Homology/Evolution ==
Phylogenetic tree displaying the relationship between KIAA0753 in humans and its orthologs

Human KIAA0753 does not have any paralogs, but has a wide variety of orthologous species. These species range from close primate relatives, to further relatives such as amphibians and various fish species. The most distant orthologs of human KIAA0753 were discovered to be the giant owl limpet and a species of acorn worm.

== Protein ==
=== Contents ===
The human KIAA0753 protein is 976 amino acids in length, and contains two notable domains. The first is a domain of unknown function, designated as DUF3498, which spans from amino acid 508 to 663. The second is designated Cdt1_m, which is a member of a protein superfamily located from amino acid 45 to 123. DUF3498 is reasonably well conserved in orthologous species, but the Cdt1_m region is not.

=== Post Translational Modifications ===
There are various predicted post-translational modifications. These include N-glycosylation sites, phosphorylation sites, C-mannosylation sites, acetylation sites, and location of protein export. A large number of phosphorylation sites are predicted with high confidence and provide evidence that, in humans, KIAA0753 is located inside the cell rather than exported out. The KIAA0753 protein does not contain any transmembrane domains.

=== Secondary Structure ===
The secondary structure of the protein is predominantly alpha-helices and coiled regions, with a small number of beta sheet regions.

=== Variants ===
The human KIAA0753 gene experiences alternative splicing. Therefore, there are four main transcriptional variants of KIAA0753. Three of them, including variant 1, are similar, while variant 4 has a truncated 5’ (beginning) region. Other transcript variants are merely fragments of the original.

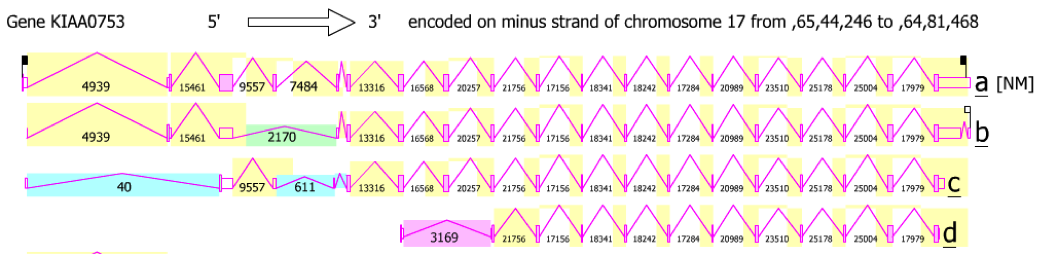
Shows the four variants of human KIAA0753 and their exon locations

== Expression ==
The promoter region for KIAA0753 is 876 nucleotides in length, and is located between bases 6543872 to 6544747. A large number of transcription factors bind to the promoter region.

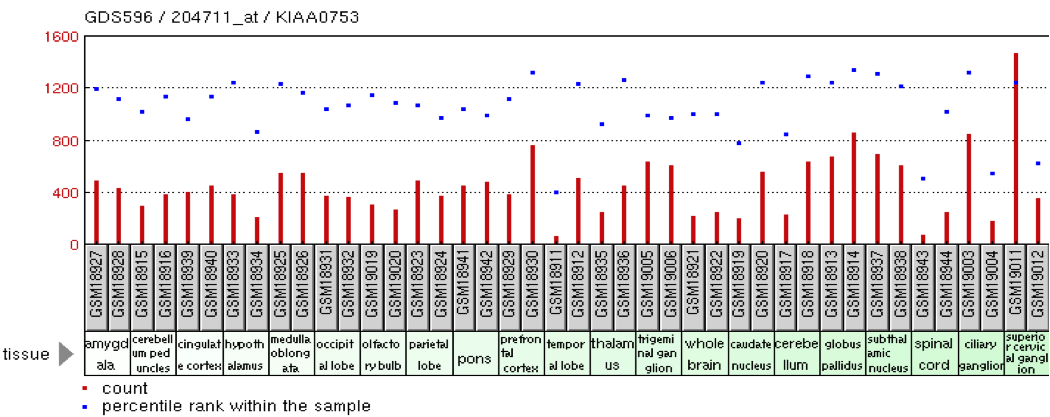
Microarray profile showing ubiquitous expression of KIAA0753 in humans

KIAA0753 is ubiquitously expressed throughout the human body at moderate to high levels. The majority of results show that conditional changes (disease, cancer, etc.) in general do not change the expression levels of the gene.

== Function ==
Researchers have studied the regulation of centriole duplication by centrosome components. The individuals conducting this experiment have identified that centrosome duplication is regulated by the following proteins: PLK4, CEP192, CEP152, CEP63, and CPAP. Among these, they found that CEP63 interacts with satellite proteins, namely KIAA0753 and another protein called CCDC14, to play a role in regulating centriole duplication. Their findings conclude that KIAA0753 positively regulates CEP63 centrosome localization and centriole duplication.

A second study has to do with the identification of hepatic microvascular adhesion-related genes of human colon cancer cells. This experiment was conducted with a variety of genes using a method called random homozygous gene perturbation. KIAA0753 was identified as a gene in a silenced state when screening for nonadherent cells. The article concludes that the identified genes, including KIAA0753, may contribute to understand the metastatic process of colon cancer and possible treatments.

== Interacting Proteins ==
Ubiquitin C has shown an interaction with KIAA0753 in humans. Further analysis of this interaction reveals that it is not due to neighboring or co-occurrence, but has been discovered experimentally. The study in question showed there to be a potential for binding between the two proteins.

The following two proteins have been predicted, with high confidence, to interact with KIAA0753 through physical/neighboring interactions: WRD19, C2CD3. KIAA0753, KIAA1609, and SAV1 were found to interact with KIAA0753, determined through textmining methods.
