= TMUB2 =

Protein-coding gene in the species Homo sapiens

Identifiers
- Aliases: TMUB2, FP2653, transmembrane and ubiquitin like domain containing 2
- External IDs: MGI: 1919303; HomoloGene: 18581; GeneCards: TMUB2; OMA:TMUB2 - orthologs

Gene location (Mouse)
Chr.	Chromosome 11 (mouse)
Band	11|11 D	Start	102,175,757 bp
Band	11|11 D	End	102,180,063 bp
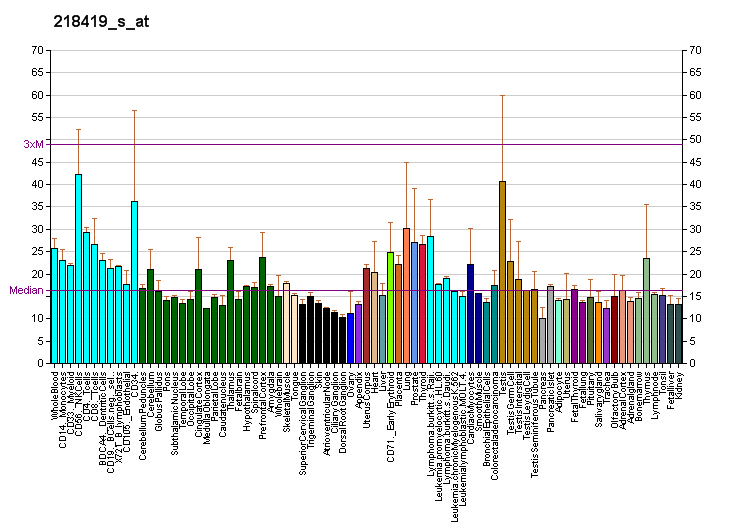
RNA expression pattern
Bgee	Human / Mouse (ortholog); n/a / Top expressed in: granulocyte; motor neuron; renal corpuscle; cumulus cell; medullary collecting duct; lacrimal gland; salivary gland; submandibular gland; Rostral migratory stream; dentate gyrus of hippocampal formation granule cell
BioGPS	More reference expression data
Gene ontology
Molecular function	protein binding
Cellular component	membrane; integral component of membrane
Biological process	ubiquitin-dependent ERAD pathway
Sources:Amigo / QuickGO
Orthologs
Species	Human	Mouse
Entrez	79089	72053
Ensembl	ENSG00000168591	ENSMUSG00000034757
UniProt	Q71RG4	Q3V209
RefSeq (mRNA)	NM_001076674; NM_024107; NM_177441; NM_001330235	NM_028076; NM_001302505; NM_001302506
RefSeq (protein)	NP_001070142; NP_001317164; NP_077012; NP_803190; NP_001340102 NP_001340103; NP_001340104; NP_001340105; NP_001340106; NP_001340107; NP_001340109; NP_001340110; NP_001340111; NP_001340112; NP_001340113; NP_001340114; NP_001340115; NP_001340116; NP_001340117; NP_001340118; NP_001340119; NP_001340120	NP_001289434; NP_001289435; NP_082352
Location (UCSC)	n/a	Chr 11: 102.18 – 102.18 Mb
PubMed search
- Wikidata
View/Edit Human	View/Edit Mouse

Transmembrane and ubiquitin-like domain-containing protein 2 is a protein that in humans is encoded by the TMUB2 gene.

== Gene ==
TMUB2 maps on the human chromosome 17, at locus 17q21.31. TMUB2 sits between two neighboring genes, ASB16-AS1 to the left and ATXN7L3 to the right. TMUB2 is 4.99Kb long. The TMUB2 gene can be transcribed into three possible mRNA variants.

== Expression ==
TMUB2 is likely ubiquitously expressed throughout the human body. It has a high expression level that is 2.9 times higher than other human genes.

== Protein ==
The TMUB2 protein has a function that is not currently known. It consists of a 321 amino acid long chain in humans. The human protein has a molecular weight of 33.8kdal, an isoelectric point of 4.73899, and three transmembrane regions. These will likely vary in orthologs.

== Homology ==
=== Paralogs ===
TMUB1 is the only paralog of TMUB2. These proteins share a 38% identity and 51% similarity.

=== Orthologs ===
The table below presents a selection of some of the TMUB2 orthologs to display protein diversity among species.

Species	Common name	Accession number	Sequence length (aa)	Sequence identity	Sequence similarity
Pan troglodytes	Chimpanzee	XP_003953053.1	301	100%	100%
Felis Catus	Cat	XP_003997025.1	322	95%	95%
Mus Musculus	Mouse	AAH29841.2	319	85%	88%
Alligator Mississippiensus	Alligator	XP_006271613.1	306	61%	71%
Haliaeetus leucocephalus	Bald Eagle	XP_010559728	301	59%	70%
Danio rerio	Zebrafish	NP_001005573.1	291	47%	60%
Acromyrmex echinatior	Ant	XP_011049429.1	354	23%	42%
Nannochloropsis Gaditana*	Algae	EWM26843.1	476	41%	54%
Coccidioides immitis RS*	Pathogenic Fungus	XP_001242306.1	418	38%	50%

*Limited Query Coverage

== Protein Interactions ==
In humans, Ubiquitin C (UBC) is a protein with a known interaction with TMUB2. Other proposed interactions include BCL2L13 (BCL2-like 13), SGTA (Small glutamine-rich tetratricopeptide repeat-containing protein), and UBQLN1 (Ubiquilin-1).
