= Ubiquitin A-52 residue ribosomal protein fusion product 1 =

Human protein

UBA52
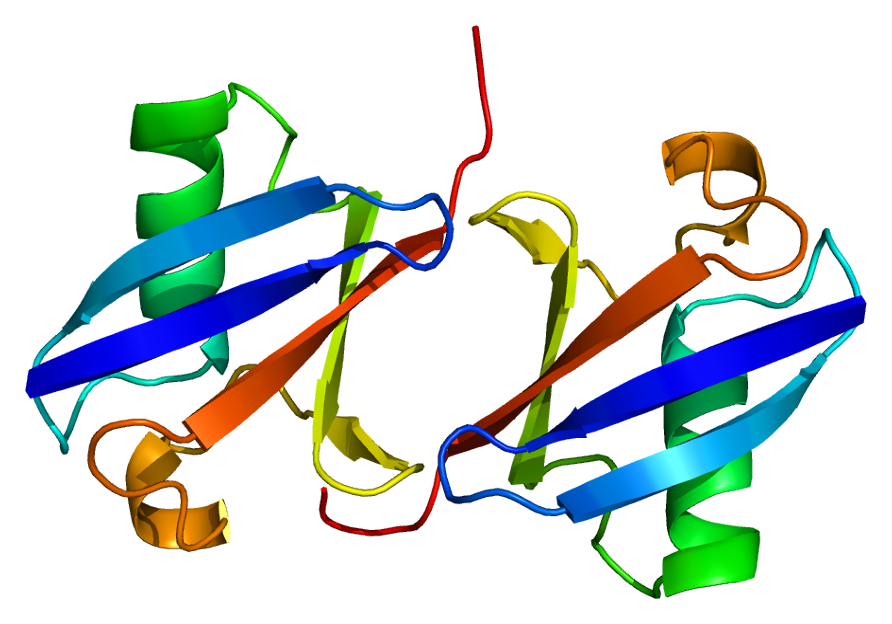

Identifiers
- Aliases: UBA52, CEP52, HUBCEP52, L40, RPL40, Ubiquitin A-52 residue ribosomal protein fusion product 1
- External IDs: OMIM: 191321; MGI: 3644625; GeneCards: UBA52
Available structures
| PDB | Human UniProt search: PDBe RCSB |
| PDB | List of PDB id codes 2LJ5, 2MBH, 2MJB, 2MUR, 2RSU, 4HJK, 4JIO, 4P4H, 4PIG, 4PIH, 4PIJ, 4RF0, 4RF1, 4S1Z, 4UG0, 4V6X, 5AJ0, 4UJD, 4D67, 4UJC, 3J7P, 3J7Q, 4XKL, 3J92, 4D5Y, 3J7O, 3J7R, 3PHD, 2KOX, 4UJE, 5A5B, 2N3V, 2N3U, 2N3W, 2NBD, 2NBE, 3VDZ, 5HPS, 3I3T, 5HPT, 5JBV, 5HPL, 5HPK, 5J8P |

Gene location (Human)
| Chr. | Chromosome 19 (human) |
| Band | 19p13.11 | Start | 18,571,730 bp |
| Band | 19p13.11 | End | 18,577,550 bp |
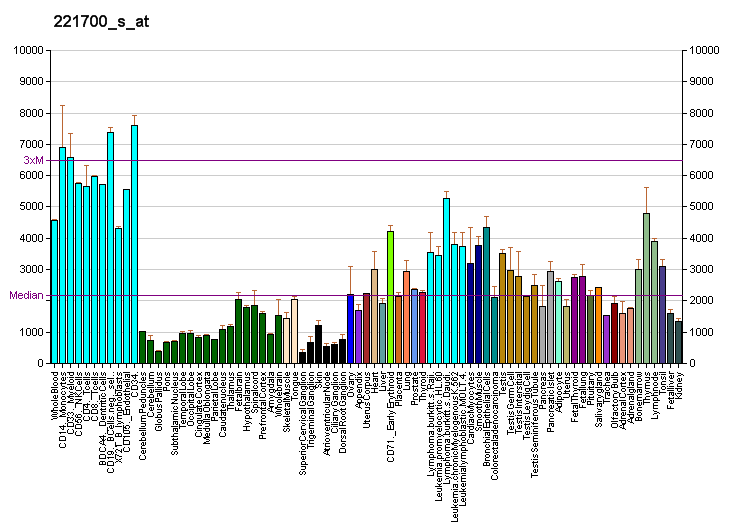
RNA expression pattern
| Bgee | Human / Mouse (ortholog); Top expressed in: blood; right testis; left testis; granulocyte; sperm; stromal cell of endometrium; lymph node; left ovary; mononuclear cell; monocyte / n/a; More reference expression data |
| BioGPS | More reference expression data |
Gene ontology
| Molecular function | structural constituent of ribosome; protein binding; protein tag; ubiquitin protein ligase binding |
| Cellular component | cytoplasm; endocytic vesicle membrane; nucleus; ribosome; extracellular exosome; endosome membrane; lysosomal membrane; extracellular space; nucleoplasm; mitochondrial outer membrane; endoplasmic reticulum; cytosol; plasma membrane; endoplasmic reticulum quality control compartment; vesicle; endoplasmic reticulum membrane; host cell; cytosolic large ribosomal subunit; cytosolic small ribosomal subunit; synapse |
| Biological process | DNA damage response, signal transduction by p53 class mediator resulting in cell cycle arrest; negative regulation of epidermal growth factor receptor signaling pathway; interstrand cross-link repair; nucleotide-excision repair, DNA damage recognition; positive regulation of canonical Wnt signaling pathway; tumor necrosis factor-mediated signaling pathway; regulation of type I interferon production; TRIF-dependent toll-like receptor signaling pathway; Fc-epsilon receptor signaling pathway; endosomal transport; global genome nucleotide-excision repair; NIK/NF-kappaB signaling; G2/M transition of mitotic cell cycle; stress-activated MAPK cascade; transforming growth factor beta receptor signaling pathway; macroautophagy; negative regulation of canonical Wnt signaling pathway; nucleotide-excision repair, DNA gap filling; viral transcription; error-free translesion synthesis; regulation of tumor necrosis factor-mediated signaling pathway; stimulatory C-type lectin receptor signaling pathway; negative regulation of transforming growth factor beta receptor signaling pathway; SRP-dependent cotranslational protein targeting to membrane; JNK cascade; regulation of transcription from RNA polymerase II promoter in response to hypoxia; nucleotide-excision repair, DNA incision; I-kappaB kinase/NF-kappaB signaling; innate immune response; Notch signaling pathway; regulation of mRNA stability; protein polyubiquitination; negative regulation of apoptotic process; negative regulation of transcription by RNA polymerase II; virion assembly; positive regulation of NF-kappaB transcription factor activity; anaphase-promoting complex-dependent catabolic process; negative regulation of type I interferon production; nuclear-transcribed mRNA catabolic process, nonsense-mediated decay; nucleotide-binding oligomerization domain containing signaling pathway; intracellular transport of virus; viral life cycle; MyD88-dependent toll-like receptor signaling pathway; error-prone translesion synthesis; MAPK cascade; fibroblast growth factor receptor signaling pathway; ion transmembrane transport; glycogen biosynthetic process; positive regulation of apoptotic process; translational initiation; positive regulation of I-kappaB kinase/NF-kappaB signaling; translesion synthesis; transcription-coupled nucleotide-excision repair; T cell receptor signaling pathway; MyD88-independent toll-like receptor signaling pathway; positive regulation of transcription by RNA polymerase II; positive regulation of epidermal growth factor receptor signaling pathway; proteasome-mediated ubiquitin-dependent protein catabolic process; regulation of signal transduction by p53 class mediator; Wnt signaling pathway, planar cell polarity pathway; nucleotide-excision repair, DNA incision, 5'-to lesion; protein biosynthesis; nucleotide-excision repair, preincision complex assembly; rRNA processing; Wnt signaling pathway; ERBB2 signaling pathway; nucleotide-excision repair, DNA duplex unwinding; protein folding; negative regulation of G2/M transition of mitotic cell cycle; protein ubiquitination; protein deubiquitination; SCF-dependent proteasomal ubiquitin-dependent protein catabolic process; entry of bacterium into host cell; transmembrane transport; regulation of necroptotic process; membrane organization; endoplasmic reticulum mannose trimming; cellular iron ion homeostasis; regulation of hematopoietic stem cell differentiation; protein targeting to peroxisome; cytokine-mediated signaling pathway; modification-dependent protein catabolic process; interleukin-1-mediated signaling pathway; response to insecticide |
Sources:Amigo / QuickGO
Orthologs
| Databases | NCBI: entry; OMA: entry |
| Species | Human | Mouse |
| Entrez | 7311 | 665964 |
| Ensembl | ENSG00000221983 | n/a |
| UniProt | P62987 | n/a |
| RefSeq (mRNA) | NM_001033930; NM_003333; NM_001321017; NM_001321018; NM_001321019 NM_001321020; NM_001321021; NM_001321022 | n/a |
| RefSeq (protein) | NP_001029102; NP_001307946; NP_001307947; NP_001307948; NP_001307949 NP_001307950; NP_001307951; NP_003324 | n/a |
| Location (UCSC) | Chr 19: 18.57 – 18.58 Mb | n/a |
| PubMed search |
- Wikidata
| View/Edit Human | View/Edit Mouse |

60S ribosomal protein L40 (RPL40) is a protein that in humans is encoded by the UBA52 gene.

== Function ==
Ubiquitin is a highly conserved nuclear and cytoplasmic protein that has a major role in targeting cellular proteins for degradation by the 26S proteosome. It is also involved in the maintenance of chromatin structure, the regulation of gene expression, and the stress response. Ubiquitin is synthesized as a precursor protein consisting of either polyubiquitin chains or a single ubiquitin moiety fused to an unrelated protein. This gene encodes a fusion protein consisting of ubiquitin at the N-terminus and ribosomal protein L40 at the C-terminus, a C-terminal extension protein (CEP). Multiple processed pseudogenes derived from this gene are present in the genome.
