= UBL7 =

Protein-coding gene in the species Homo sapiens

Available structures
PDB	Ortholog search: PDBe RCSB
PDB	List of PDB id codes 2CWB

Identifiers
- Aliases: UBL7, BMSC-UbP, TCBA1, ubiquitin like 7
- External IDs: OMIM: 609748; MGI: 1916709; HomoloGene: 12312; GeneCards: UBL7; OMA:UBL7 - orthologs

Gene location (Human)
Chr.	Chromosome 15 (human)
Band	15q24.1	Start	74,445,977 bp
Band	15q24.1	End	74,461,182 bp

Gene location (Mouse)
Chr.	Chromosome 9 (mouse)
Band	9 B|9	Start	57,910,979 bp
Band	9 B|9	End	57,929,968 bp
RNA expression pattern
Bgee	Human / Mouse (ortholog); Top expressed in: primary visual cortex; prefrontal cortex; apex of heart; muscle of thigh; gastrocnemius muscle; superior frontal gyrus; right frontal lobe; Brodmann area 9; blood; anterior cingulate cortex / Top expressed in: spermatid; seminiferous tubule; spermatocyte; interventricular septum; muscle of thigh; visual cortex; ventricular zone; primary visual cortex; lip; zygote; More reference expression data
BioGPS	n/a
Gene ontology
Molecular function	protein binding; polyubiquitin modification-dependent protein binding
Cellular component	cytosol
Biological process	ubiquitin-dependent protein catabolic process
Sources:Amigo / QuickGO
Orthologs
Species	Human	Mouse
Entrez	84993	69459
Ensembl	ENSG00000138629; ENSG00000288408	ENSMUSG00000055720
UniProt	Q96S82	Q91W67
RefSeq (mRNA)	NM_001286739; NM_001286740; NM_001286741; NM_001286742; NM_032907 NM_201265	NM_001122873; NM_027086
RefSeq (protein)	NP_001273668; NP_001273669; NP_001273670; NP_001273671; NP_116296 NP_957717	NP_001116345; NP_081362
Location (UCSC)	Chr 15: 74.45 – 74.46 Mb	Chr 9: 57.91 – 57.93 Mb
PubMed search
- Wikidata
View/Edit Human	View/Edit Mouse

Ubiquitin-like 7 (bone marrow stromal cell-derived) is a protein in humans that is encoded by the UBL7 gene.
