= Prokaryotic ubiquitin-like protein =

Pup-like protein family
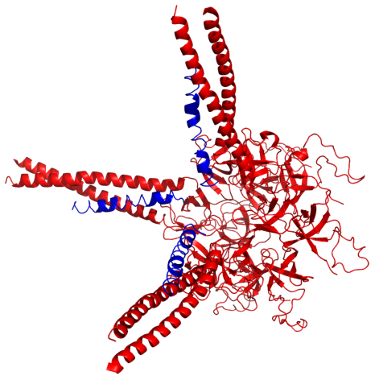
- Three Prokaryotic ubiquitin-like proteins (blue) bound to proteasomal ATPase Mpa (red

Identifiers
- Symbol: Pup
- Pfam: PF05639
- InterPro: IPR008515
Available protein structures:
- PDB: 3M91, 3M9D IPR008515 PF05639 (ECOD; PDBsum)
- AlphaFold: IPR008515; PF05639

Prokaryotic ubiquitin-like protein (Pup) is a functional analog of ubiquitin found in the prokaryote Mycobacterium tuberculosis. Like ubiquitin, Pup serves to direct proteins to the proteasome for degradation in the Pup-proteasome system (PPS). However, the enzymology of ubiquitylation and pupylation is different, owing to their distinct evolutionary origins. In contrast to the three-step reaction of ubiquitylation, pupylation requires only two steps, and thus only two enzymes are involved in pupylation. The enzymes involved in pupylation are descended from glutamine synthetase.

Similar to ubiquitin, Pup is attached to specific lysine residues of substrate proteins by isopeptide bonds; this is called pupylation. It is then recognized by the protein Mycobacterium proteasomal ATPase (Mpa), in a mechanism that induces folding of Pup. Mpa delivers the substrate protein to the proteasome for degradation by coupling of ATP hydrolysis.

The discovery of Pup indicates that like eukaryotes, bacteria may use a small-protein modifier to control protein stability.

The Pup gene encodes a 64–amino acid protein with a molecular size of about 6.9 kDa.

Pup is an intrinsically disordered protein. In 2010, scientists at the Brookhaven National Laboratory determined the X-ray crystal structure 3M9D of the complex between Pup and its delivery enzyme Mpa and found that Pup binding to Mpa induces the folding of a unique alpha-helix.

In 2017, the presence of Pup homologs in bacterial species outside of the group of gram-positive bacteria was reported. The Pup homologs were termed UBact (for Ubiquitin Bacterial), although the distinction has not been proven to be phylogenetically supported by a separate evolutionary origin and is without experimental evidence. UBact is a homolog of Pup, and is found in several phyla of gram-negative bacteria (Pup is found predominantly in the gram-positive bacterial phylum Actinomycetota).

== Ubiquitin bacterial ==
Prokaryotic ubiquitin-like protein

Identifiers
- Symbol: UBact
- InterPro: IPR037543
Available protein structures:
- PDB: IPR037543
- AlphaFold: IPR037543

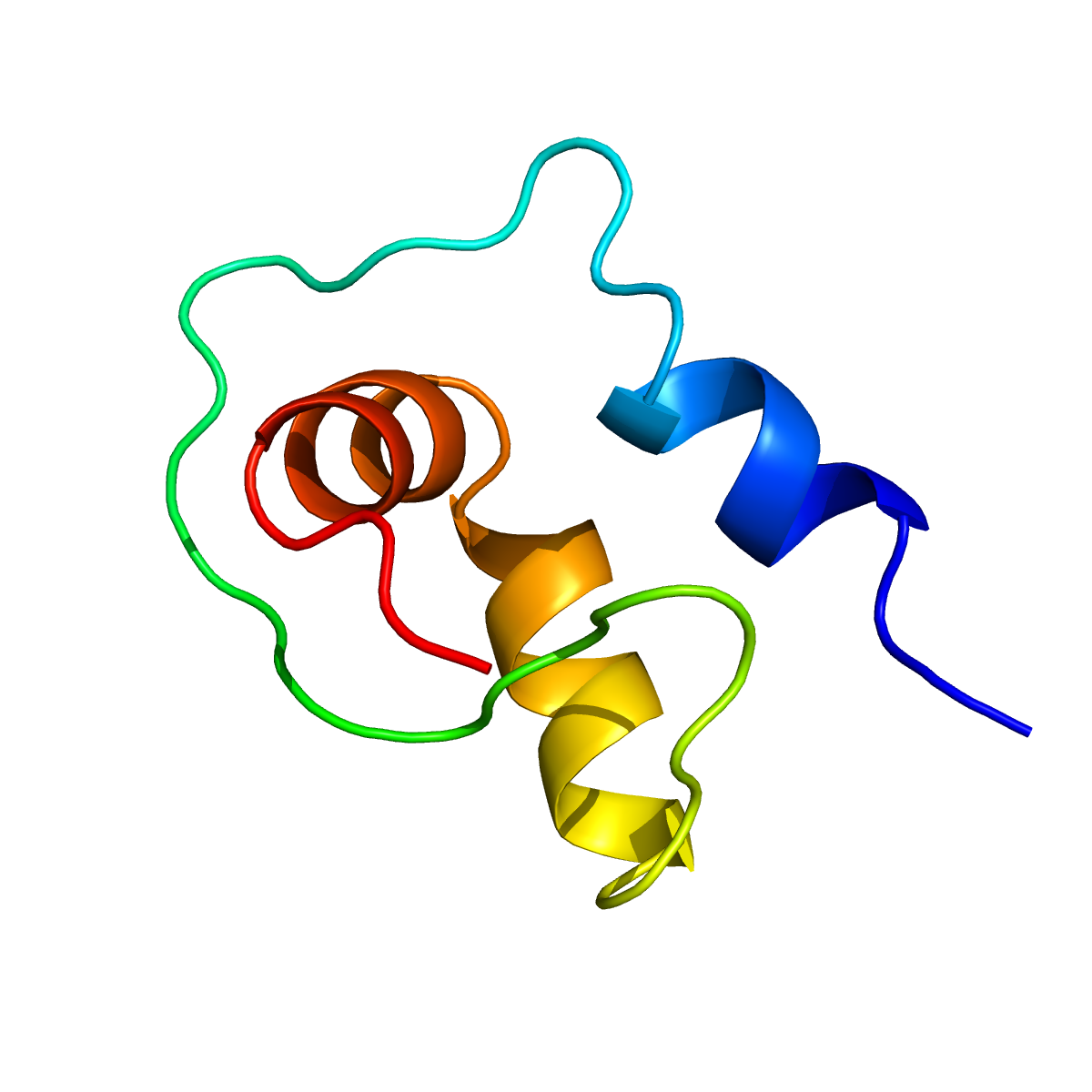
Figure 1. A diagram of the UBact Pup homolog. Phyre2 server was used to predict the structure of the UBact Pup homolog from the bacterium Methylacidiphilum infernorum. Given the similarity to Pup, the prediction of a structure is doubtful, as Pup is proven to be instrinsically disordered in solution (see text for references).

Ubiquitin Bacterial (UBact) is a protein that is homologous to Prokaryotic ubiquitin-like protein (Pup). UBact was recently described by the group of Professor Aaron Ciechanover at the Technion, Israel.

Ubiquitin was named for its ubiquitous presence among eukaryotes, while UBact ('Ubiquitin bacterial') is very limited in occurrence among the vast number of bacterial species. The terms 'Ubiquitin Bacterial' and 'Prokaryotic ubiquitin-like protein' suggest a molecular similarity between ubiquitin and UBact/Pup which is largely absent. While ubiquitin assumes a highly stable three-dimensional structure in solution, Pup has been shown to belong to the group of intrinsically disordered proteins.

The establishment of the term UBact is controversial, since to date there is no experimental evidence presented to justify the distinction of UBact from Pup. The term UBact was denoted because several bacterial species from the phylum Nitrospirae (where UBact was initially identified; e.g., Leptospirillum ferriphilum) contain both the Pup-proteasome system and a novel ORF-proteasome system that needed to be addressed and therefore was denoted UBact. The conjugation-proteasome components neighboring the UBact and Pup loci in these Nitrospirae bacteria show weak similarity and are probably not entirely redundant. Figure 2 illustrates the differences between the UBact and Pup loci in the representative Nitrospirae bacterium Leptospirillum ferrodiazotrophum. Further analyses of the UBact (and not Pup) locus in Leptospirillum ferrodiazotrophum revealed its existence and extreme conservation across several gram-negative bacterial phyla, as illustrated in figure 3.

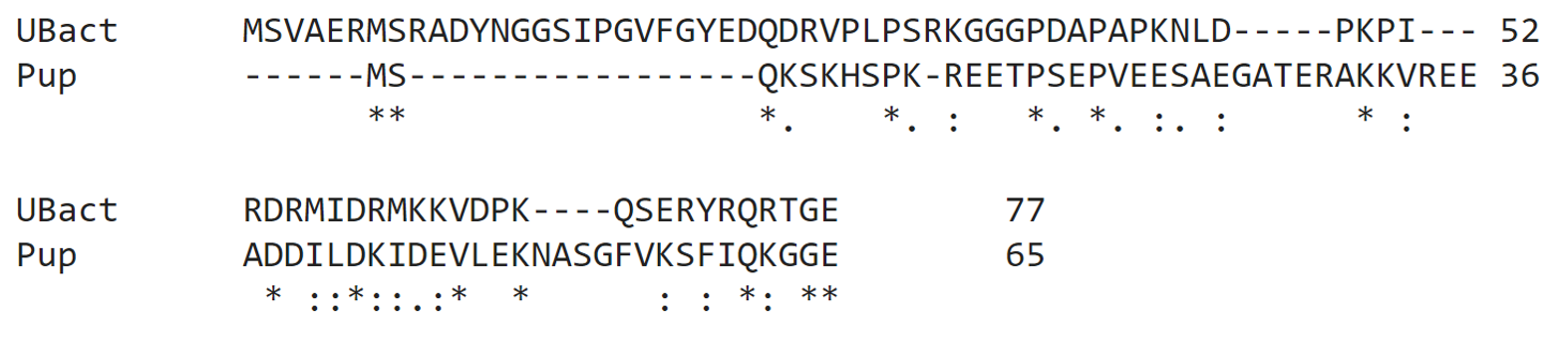
Figure 2. Alignment of UBact (EES53751) and Pup (EES52728) from the bacterium Leptospirillum ferrodiazotrophum to assess their similarity.

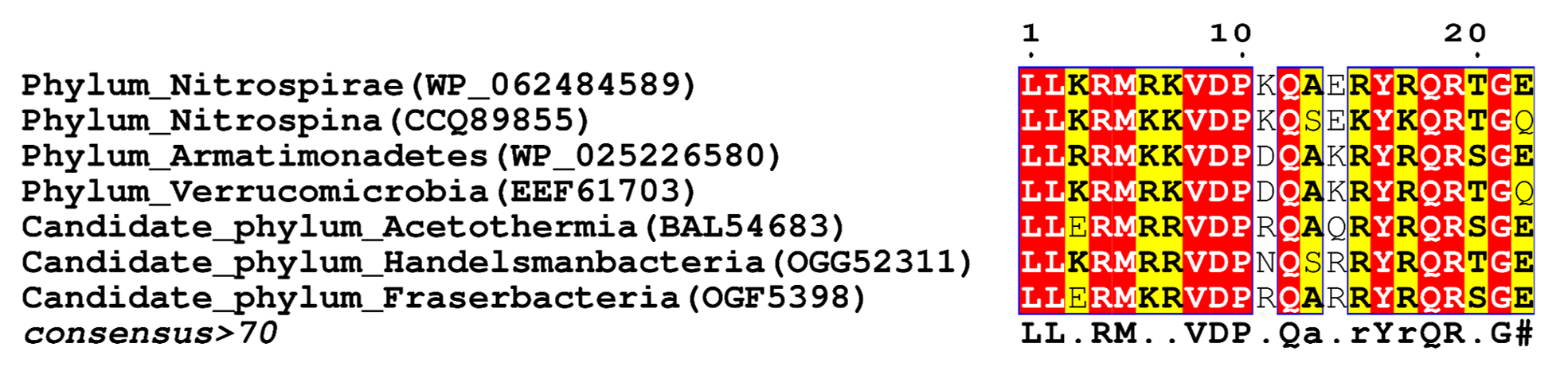
Figure 3. Demonstration of UBact C-terminus conservation across tremendous evolutionary distance.

In spite of the large difference in sequence, UBact is homologous to Pup and shares several characteristics with it: (i) same genomic location within a cluster of genes homologous to Mpa -> Dop -> Pup/UBact -> PrcB -> PrcA -> PafA, (ii) C-terminal sequence that ends exclusively with glutamine or glutamate across bacterial species, (iii) short size (similar to that of ubiquitin) and, (iv) high sequence conservation across tremendous evolutionary distance (a characteristic also in common with ubiquitin). The differences between UBact and Pup are their taxonomic distribution and amino acid sequences. While Pup is predominantly found in the gram-positive phylum Actinomycetota, UBact was identified only in gram-negative bacteria from the following five phyla: Nitrospirota, Verrucomicrobiota, Armatimonadota, Nitrospinota, and Planctomycetota. UBact was also identified in the genomes of several candidatus bacteria, and specifically from the candidate divisions "Acetothermia", "Handelsmanbacteria", "Fraserbacteria", "Terrybacteria", "Poribacteria", "Parcubacteria", and "Yanofskybacteria". With regard to the amino acid sequence, in difference from Pup and Ubiquitin, UBact does not contain a di-glycine motif at its C-terminus. Rather, it usually ends with the sequence R[T/S]G[E/Q] (see figure 3).

It took almost ten years since the discovery of Pup in 2008, to identify UBact. This is probably due to the difference between Pup and UBact amino acids sequences, and because very few bacteria from the five phyla where UBact is found have been sequenced.

Bacteria from the phyla where UBact is found interact with humans, and are found in the human gut microbiota. In marine systems, the most frequently encountered nitrogen-oxidizing bacteria are related to the UBact encoding Nitrospina gracilis From the knowledge accumulated about the Pup-proteasome system and its importance in bacterial durability and disease causing ability, the homologous UBact-proteasome system is expected to have similar impact on the gram-negative bacteria where it is found. In addition to humans, animals such livestock and fish that eat from the ground or swim in water are expected to be constantly exposed to UBact containing bacteria in the soil and water respectively.

From evolutionary perspective, the finding of the UBact-proteasome system in gram-negative bacteria suggests that either the Pup/UBact-proteasome systems evolved in bacteria prior to the split into gram positive and negative clades over 3000 million years ago or, that these systems were acquired by different bacterial lineages through horizontal gene transfer(s) from a third, yet unknown, organism. In support of the second possibility, two UBact loci were found in the genome of an uncultured anaerobic methanotrophic Archaeon (ANME-1;locus CBH38808.1 and locus CBH39258.1). More possibilities exist.

Update: UBact is also found in the gram-negative bacterial phylum Gemmatimonadota (e.g., A0A2E8WA32, A0A2E3J6F7, A0A2E7JSE3) in the candidate phylum "Latescibacteria" (previously known as WS3; e.g., A0A3D2RHP4, A0A3D5FTR6, A0A3D4H075, and A0A3B8MMW3), in the phylum "Abditibacteriota" (previously candidate phylum FBP; e.g., A0A2S8SU03), and in the phylum Candidatus Bipolaricaulota (e.g., H5SEU7 and H5SQ95).

== See also ==
- Ubiquitin
- SUMO protein
- Neddylation
