= Ubiquitin B =

Protein found in humans

UBB
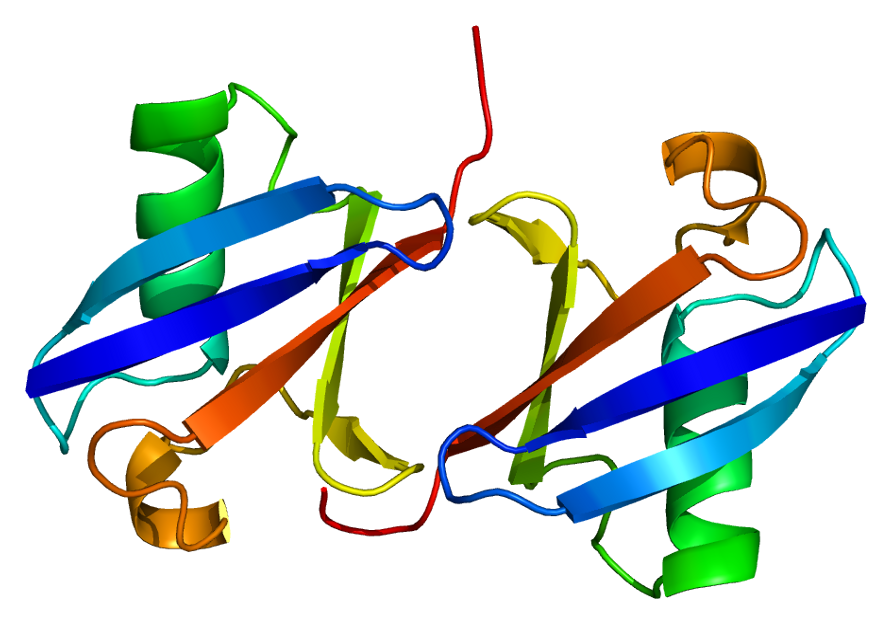

Identifiers
- Aliases: UBB, HEL-S-50, Ubiquitin B
- External IDs: OMIM: 191339; MGI: 98888; GeneCards: UBB
Available structures
PDB	Ortholog search: PDBe RCSB
PDB	List of PDB id codes 2KHW, 2MBB, 2MRO, 2MSG, 4UEL, 4UF6, 4WLR, 4WUR, 4ZPZ, 5CAW, 3OJ3, 5DK8, 5CRA, 4ZFR, 5CVO, 3ZLZ, 4WHV, 4ZFT, 3ZNH, 5D0M, 2Y5B, 2KWV, 5D0K, 5DFL, 5CVM, 4WZP, 5EDV, 5CVN, 2KWU, 4XOF, 5BNB, 2N13, 4ZUX, 5IFR, 5IBK, 5KGF, 5JG6, 5K9P, 5E6J

Gene location (Human)
Chr.	Chromosome 17 (human)
Band	17p11.2	Start	16,380,798 bp
Band	17p11.2	End	16,382,745 bp

Gene location (Mouse)
Chr.	Chromosome 11 (mouse)
Band	11 B2|11 38.46 cM	Start	62,441,997 bp
Band	11 B2|11 38.46 cM	End	62,444,039 bp
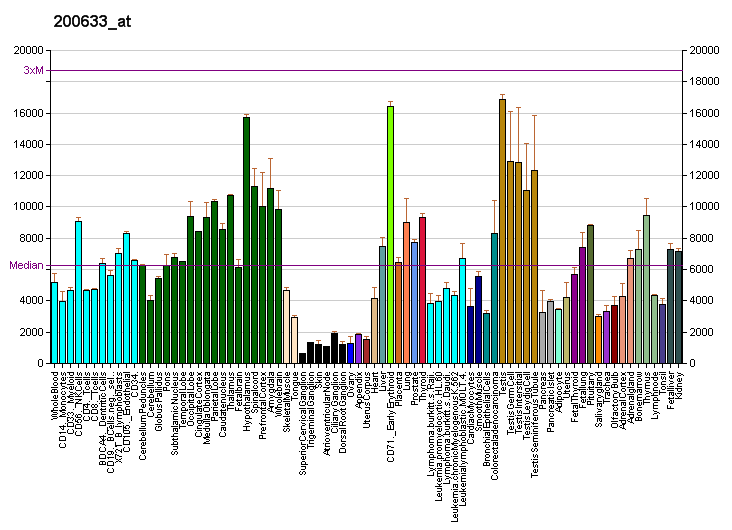
RNA expression pattern
Bgee	Human / Mouse (ortholog); Top expressed in: pons; pars reticulata; pars compacta; endothelial cell; lateral nuclear group of thalamus; middle temporal gyrus; pancreatic ductal cell; external globus pallidus; bronchial epithelial cell; retinal pigment epithelium / Top expressed in: neural tube; primary oocyte; blastocyst; mesencephalon; dentate gyrus of hippocampal formation granule cell; rhombencephalon; primary visual cortex; cerebellar cortex; superior frontal gyrus; hypothalamus; More reference expression data
BioGPS	More reference expression data
Gene ontology
Molecular function	protein binding; protein tag; ubiquitin protein ligase binding
Cellular component	cytoplasm; endocytic vesicle membrane; cytosol; mitochondrion; neuron projection; nucleus; extracellular exosome; plasma membrane; nucleoplasm; soma; endosome membrane; extracellular space; mitochondrial outer membrane; endoplasmic reticulum quality control compartment; vesicle; endoplasmic reticulum membrane; host cell
Biological process	DNA damage response, signal transduction by p53 class mediator resulting in cell cycle arrest; negative regulation of epidermal growth factor receptor signaling pathway; interstrand cross-link repair; nucleotide-excision repair, DNA damage recognition; positive regulation of canonical Wnt signaling pathway; tumor necrosis factor-mediated signaling pathway; regulation of type I interferon production; positive regulation of protein monoubiquitination; TRIF-dependent toll-like receptor signaling pathway; Fc-epsilon receptor signaling pathway; endosomal transport; global genome nucleotide-excision repair; NIK/NF-kappaB signaling; G2/M transition of mitotic cell cycle; stress-activated MAPK cascade; transforming growth factor beta receptor signaling pathway; macroautophagy; negative regulation of canonical Wnt signaling pathway; nucleotide-excision repair, DNA gap filling; error-free translesion synthesis; regulation of tumor necrosis factor-mediated signaling pathway; stimulatory C-type lectin receptor signaling pathway; negative regulation of transforming growth factor beta receptor signaling pathway; JNK cascade; regulation of transcription from RNA polymerase II promoter in response to hypoxia; nucleotide-excision repair, DNA incision; I-kappaB kinase/NF-kappaB signaling; innate immune response; Notch signaling pathway; neuron projection morphogenesis; regulation of mRNA stability; protein polyubiquitination; negative regulation of apoptotic process; negative regulation of transcription by RNA polymerase II; virion assembly; positive regulation of intrinsic apoptotic signaling pathway by p53 class mediator; positive regulation of NF-kappaB transcription factor activity; anaphase-promoting complex-dependent catabolic process; negative regulation of type I interferon production; nucleotide-binding oligomerization domain containing signaling pathway; positive regulation of protein ubiquitination; intracellular transport of virus; regulation of proteasomal protein catabolic process; viral life cycle; MyD88-dependent toll-like receptor signaling pathway; error-prone translesion synthesis; MAPK cascade; regulation of mitochondrial membrane potential; fibroblast growth factor receptor signaling pathway; ion transmembrane transport; glycogen biosynthetic process; regulation of neuron death; positive regulation of apoptotic process; positive regulation of I-kappaB kinase/NF-kappaB signaling; translesion synthesis; transcription-coupled nucleotide-excision repair; mitochondrion transport along microtubule; T cell receptor signaling pathway; MyD88-independent toll-like receptor signaling pathway; positive regulation of transcription by RNA polymerase II; regulation of signal transduction by p53 class mediator; positive regulation of epidermal growth factor receptor signaling pathway; Wnt signaling pathway; nucleotide-excision repair, DNA duplex unwinding; nucleotide-excision repair, DNA incision, 5'-to lesion; ERBB2 signaling pathway; Wnt signaling pathway, planar cell polarity pathway; nucleotide-excision repair, preincision complex assembly; proteasome-mediated ubiquitin-dependent protein catabolic process; protein folding; negative regulation of G2/M transition of mitotic cell cycle; protein ubiquitination; protein deubiquitination; SCF-dependent proteasomal ubiquitin-dependent protein catabolic process; entry of bacterium into host cell; transmembrane transport; regulation of necroptotic process; membrane organization; endoplasmic reticulum mannose trimming; cellular iron ion homeostasis; regulation of hematopoietic stem cell differentiation; protein targeting to peroxisome; male meiosis I; female meiosis I; male gonad development; female gonad development; cytokine-mediated signaling pathway; modification-dependent protein catabolic process; hypothalamus gonadotrophin-releasing hormone neuron development; adipose tissue development; fat pad development; interleukin-1-mediated signaling pathway; seminiferous tubule development; energy homeostasis
Sources:Amigo / QuickGO
Orthologs
Databases	NCBI: entry; OMA: entry
Species	Human	Mouse
Entrez	7314	22187
Ensembl	ENSG00000170315	ENSMUSG00000019505
UniProt	P0CG47	P0CG49
RefSeq (mRNA)	NM_018955; NM_001281716; NM_001281717; NM_001281718; NM_001281719 NM_001281720	NM_011664; NM_001313984
RefSeq (protein)	NP_001268645; NP_001268646; NP_001268647; NP_001268648; NP_001268649 NP_061828	NP_001300913; NP_035794
Location (UCSC)	Chr 17: 16.38 – 16.38 Mb	Chr 11: 62.44 – 62.44 Mb
PubMed search
- Wikidata
View/Edit Human	View/Edit Mouse

Ubiquitin is a protein that in humans is encoded by the UBB gene.

== Function ==
Ubiquitin is one of the most conserved proteins known in eukaryotic organisms. Ubiquitin is required for ATP-dependent, non-lysosomal intracellular protein degradation of abnormal proteins and normal proteins with a rapid turnover. Ubiquitin is covalently bound to proteins to be degraded, and presumably labels these proteins for degradation. Ubiquitin also binds to histone H2A in actively transcribed regions but does not cause histone H2A degradation, suggesting that ubiquitin is also involved in regulation of gene expression. This gene consists of three direct repeats of the ubiquitin coding sequence with no spacer sequence. Consequently, the protein is expressed as a polyubiquitin precursor with a final amino acid after the last repeat. Aberrant form of this protein (UBB+1) has been noticed in patients with Alzheimer's disease, Down syndrome, other tauopathies (e.g. Pick's disease) and polyglutamine disease (e.g. Huntington's disease).
