= Large proline-rich protein BAG6 =

Protein-coding gene in the species Homo sapiens

BAG6
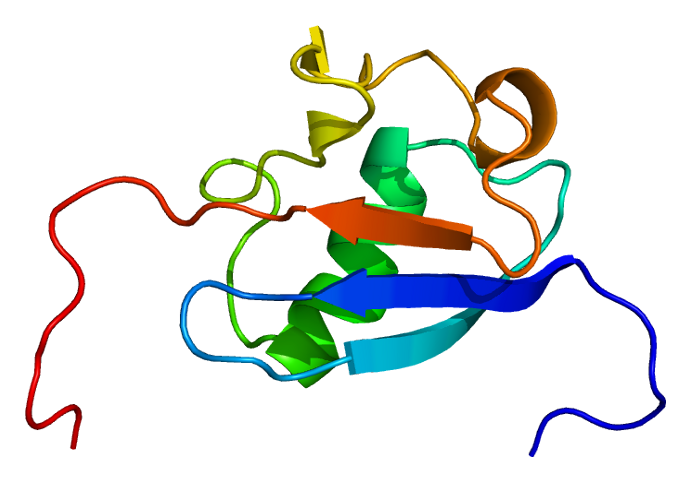

Identifiers
- Aliases: BAG6, BAG-6, BAT3, D6S52E, G3, HLA-B associated transcript 3, BCL2 associated athanogene 6, BAG cochaperone 6
- External IDs: OMIM: 142590; MGI: 1919439; GeneCards: BAG6
Available structures
PDB	Ortholog search: PDBe RCSB
PDB	List of PDB id codes 1WX9, 4DWF, 4EEW, 4WWR, 4X86, 2N9P

Gene location (Human)
Chr.	Chromosome 6 (human)
Band	6p21.33	Start	31,639,028 bp
Band	6p21.33	End	31,652,705 bp

Gene location (Mouse)
Chr.	Chromosome 17 (mouse)
Band	17 B1|17 18.59 cM	Start	35,135,178 bp
Band	17 B1|17 18.59 cM	End	35,147,322 bp
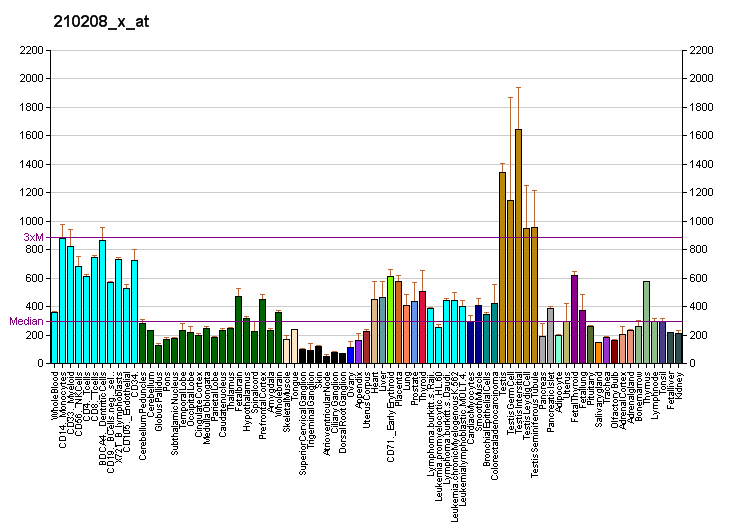

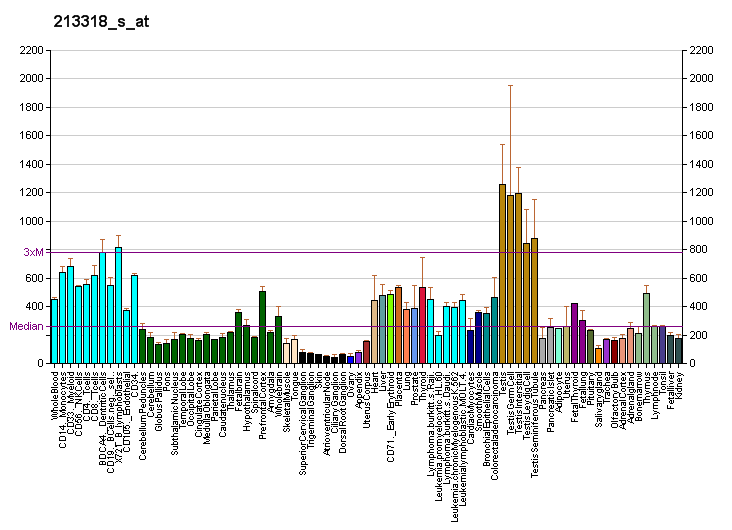

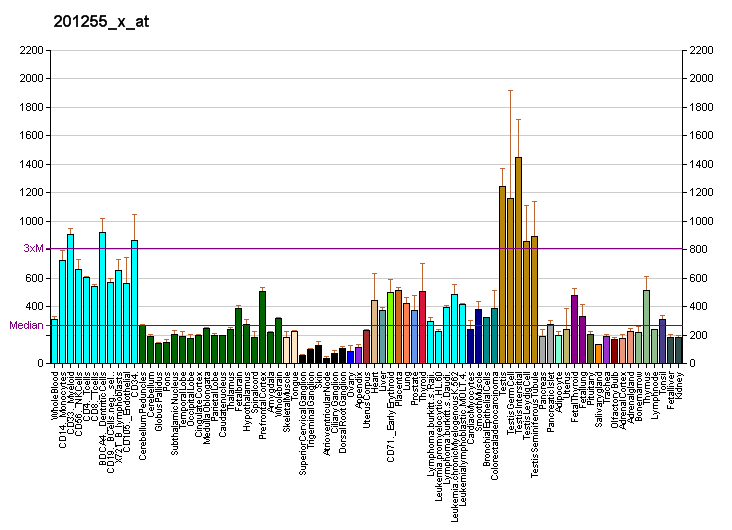
RNA expression pattern
Bgee	Human / Mouse (ortholog); Top expressed in: right testis; left testis; right lobe of thyroid gland; right uterine tube; apex of heart; pituitary gland; ganglionic eminence; left lobe of thyroid gland; anterior pituitary; muscle of thigh / Top expressed in: seminiferous tubule; spermatid; spermatocyte; neural layer of retina; ventricular zone; muscle of thigh; superior frontal gyrus; dentate gyrus of hippocampal formation granule cell; yolk sac; lip; More reference expression data
BioGPS	More reference expression data
Gene ontology
Molecular function	ribosome binding; misfolded protein binding; Hsp70 protein binding; polyubiquitin modification-dependent protein binding; proteasome binding; protein binding; ubiquitin-specific protease binding; ubiquitin protein ligase binding; signaling receptor binding; identical protein binding
Cellular component	cytoplasm; cytosol; membrane; intracellular membrane-bounded organelle; nucleoplasm; BAT3 complex; nucleus; extracellular region; extracellular exosome
Biological process	regulation of apoptotic process; negative regulation of proteolysis; intrinsic apoptotic signaling pathway in response to DNA damage by p53 class mediator; cell differentiation; ubiquitin-dependent protein catabolic process; kidney development; embryo development; lung development; immune system process; positive regulation of ERAD pathway; protein stabilization; negative regulation of apoptotic process; internal peptidyl-lysine acetylation; brain development; intrinsic apoptotic signaling pathway in response to endoplasmic reticulum stress; regulation of cell population proliferation; synaptonemal complex assembly; spermatogenesis; negative regulation of proteasomal ubiquitin-dependent protein catabolic process; protein localization to cytosolic proteasome complex involved in ERAD pathway; maintenance of unfolded protein involved in ERAD pathway; tail-anchored membrane protein insertion into ER membrane; ER-associated misfolded protein catabolic process; immune response-activating cell surface receptor signaling pathway; apoptotic process; natural killer cell activation; proteasomal protein catabolic process; ubiquitin-dependent ERAD pathway; endoplasmic reticulum stress-induced pre-emptive quality control; transport; chromatin organization; proteasome-mediated ubiquitin-dependent protein catabolic process; regulation of embryonic development
Sources:Amigo / QuickGO
Orthologs
Databases	NCBI: entry; OMA: entry
Species	Human	Mouse
Entrez	7917	224727
Ensembl	ENSG00000204463; ENSG00000228760; ENSG00000234651; ENSG00000229524; ENSG00000096155 ENSG00000227761; ENSG00000233348	ENSMUSG00000024392
UniProt	P46379	Q9Z1R2
RefSeq (mRNA)	NM_001098534; NM_001199697; NM_001199698; NM_004639; NM_080702 NM_080703	NM_001252468; NM_001252469; NM_057171
RefSeq (protein)	NP_001092004; NP_001186626; NP_001186627; NP_542433; NP_542434	NP_001239397; NP_001239398; NP_476512; NP_001359189; NP_001359190 NP_001359191; NP_001359194; NP_001359195; NP_001359196; NP_001359197; NP_001359198; NP_001359199; NP_001359200; NP_001359201; NP_001359202; NP_001359203; NP_001359204; NP_001359205; NP_001359206; NP_001359207; NP_001359208; NP_001359209; NP_001359210; NP_001359211; NP_001359212; NP_001359213; NP_001359214; NP_001359215; NP_001359216; NP_001359217; NP_001359218; NP_001359219; NP_001359220; NP_001391257; NP_001391258; NP_001391259; NP_001391260; NP_001391256
Location (UCSC)	Chr 6: 31.64 – 31.65 Mb	Chr 17: 35.14 – 35.15 Mb
PubMed search
- Wikidata
View/Edit Human	View/Edit Mouse

Large proline-rich protein BAG6 is a protein that in humans is encoded by the BAG6 gene.

A cluster of genes, BAT1-BAT5, has been localized in the vicinity of the genes for TNF alpha and TNF beta. These genes are all within the human major histocompatibility complex class III region. The protein encoded by this gene is a nuclear protein. It has been implicated in the control of apoptosis and regulating heat shock protein. There are three alternatively spliced transcript variants described for this gene.
