= 40S ribosomal protein S27a =

Protein found in humans

RPS27A
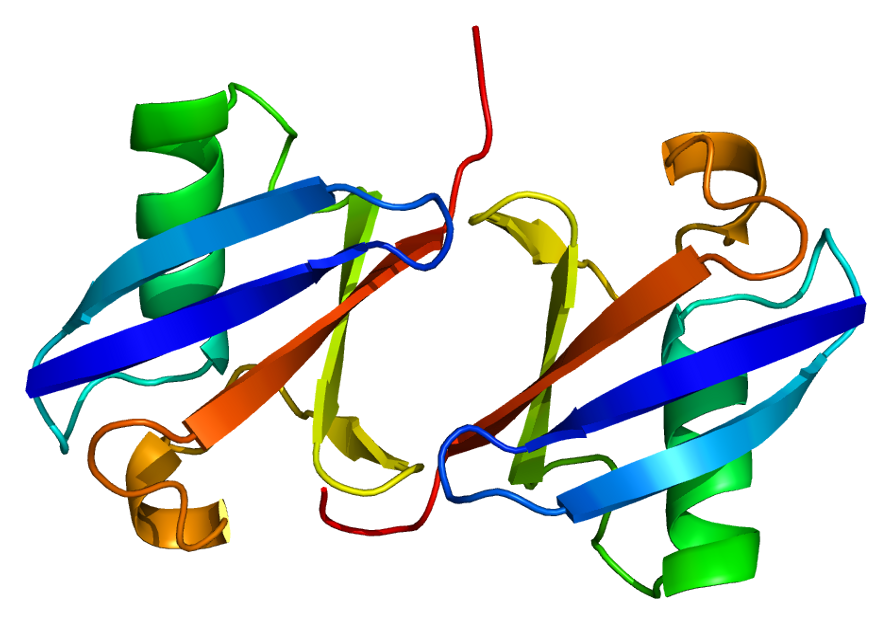

Identifiers
- Aliases: RPS27A, CEP80, HEL112, S27A, UBA80, UBC, UBCEP1, UBCEP80, ribosomal protein S27a
- External IDs: OMIM: 191343; MGI: 1925544; GeneCards: RPS27A
Available structures
PDB	Ortholog search: PDBe RCSB
PDB	List of PDB id codes 2KTF, 2L0F, 2L0T, 2XK5, 3AXC, 3NHE, 3NOB, 3PHW, 3TBL, 4UG0, 4V6X, 5AJ0, 4R62, 5FLX, 4UJD, 4KZZ, 4UJC, 3J7P, 4KZY, 4D5L, 3J7R, 4D61, 4KZX, 4UJE, 5A2Q

Gene location (Human)
Chr.	Chromosome 2 (human)
Band	2p16.1	Start	55,231,903 bp
Band	2p16.1	End	55,235,853 bp

Gene location (Mouse)
Chr.	Chromosome 11 (mouse)
Band	11|11 A3.3	Start	29,495,846 bp
Band	11|11 A3.3	End	29,498,109 bp
RNA expression pattern
Bgee	Human / Mouse (ortholog); Top expressed in: left ovary; granulocyte; ganglionic eminence; right uterine tube; canal of the cervix; right ovary; body of uterus; ventricular zone; left lobe of thyroid gland; anterior pituitary / Top expressed in: embryo; embryo; epiblast; urinary bladder; bone marrow; ventricular zone; uterus; pancreas; adrenal gland; lens; More reference expression data
BioGPS	n/a
Gene ontology
Molecular function	metal ion binding; structural constituent of ribosome; protein binding; RNA binding; protein tag; ubiquitin protein ligase binding
Cellular component	cytoplasm; endocytic vesicle membrane; cytosol; membrane; nucleus; ribosome; myelin sheath; cytosolic small ribosomal subunit; nucleolus; extracellular exosome; plasma membrane; nucleoplasm; small ribosomal subunit; endosome membrane; extracellular space; mitochondrial outer membrane; endoplasmic reticulum quality control compartment; vesicle; endoplasmic reticulum membrane; host cell
Biological process	DNA damage response, signal transduction by p53 class mediator resulting in cell cycle arrest; negative regulation of epidermal growth factor receptor signaling pathway; interstrand cross-link repair; nucleotide-excision repair, DNA damage recognition; positive regulation of canonical Wnt signaling pathway; tumor necrosis factor-mediated signaling pathway; regulation of type I interferon production; TRIF-dependent toll-like receptor signaling pathway; Fc-epsilon receptor signaling pathway; endosomal transport; global genome nucleotide-excision repair; NIK/NF-kappaB signaling; G2/M transition of mitotic cell cycle; stress-activated MAPK cascade; transforming growth factor beta receptor signaling pathway; macroautophagy; negative regulation of canonical Wnt signaling pathway; nucleotide-excision repair, DNA gap filling; viral transcription; error-free translesion synthesis; regulation of tumor necrosis factor-mediated signaling pathway; stimulatory C-type lectin receptor signaling pathway; negative regulation of transforming growth factor beta receptor signaling pathway; SRP-dependent cotranslational protein targeting to membrane; JNK cascade; regulation of transcription from RNA polymerase II promoter in response to hypoxia; nucleotide-excision repair, DNA incision; I-kappaB kinase/NF-kappaB signaling; innate immune response; Notch signaling pathway; regulation of mRNA stability; protein polyubiquitination; negative regulation of apoptotic process; negative regulation of transcription by RNA polymerase II; virion assembly; positive regulation of NF-kappaB transcription factor activity; anaphase-promoting complex-dependent catabolic process; negative regulation of type I interferon production; nuclear-transcribed mRNA catabolic process, nonsense-mediated decay; nucleotide-binding oligomerization domain containing signaling pathway; intracellular transport of virus; viral life cycle; MyD88-dependent toll-like receptor signaling pathway; error-prone translesion synthesis; MAPK cascade; fibroblast growth factor receptor signaling pathway; ion transmembrane transport; glycogen biosynthetic process; positive regulation of apoptotic process; translational initiation; positive regulation of I-kappaB kinase/NF-kappaB signaling; translesion synthesis; transcription-coupled nucleotide-excision repair; T cell receptor signaling pathway; MyD88-independent toll-like receptor signaling pathway; positive regulation of transcription by RNA polymerase II; regulation of signal transduction by p53 class mediator; positive regulation of epidermal growth factor receptor signaling pathway; Wnt signaling pathway; nucleotide-excision repair, DNA duplex unwinding; nucleotide-excision repair, DNA incision, 5'-to lesion; protein biosynthesis; rRNA processing; ERBB2 signaling pathway; Wnt signaling pathway, planar cell polarity pathway; nucleotide-excision repair, preincision complex assembly; proteasome-mediated ubiquitin-dependent protein catabolic process; protein folding; negative regulation of G2/M transition of mitotic cell cycle; protein ubiquitination; protein deubiquitination; SCF-dependent proteasomal ubiquitin-dependent protein catabolic process; entry of bacterium into host cell; transmembrane transport; regulation of necroptotic process; membrane organization; endoplasmic reticulum mannose trimming; cellular iron ion homeostasis; regulation of hematopoietic stem cell differentiation; protein targeting to peroxisome; cytokine-mediated signaling pathway; modification-dependent protein catabolic process; interleukin-1-mediated signaling pathway
Sources:Amigo / QuickGO
Orthologs
Databases	NCBI: entry; OMA: entry
Species	Human	Mouse
Entrez	6233	78294
Ensembl	ENSG00000143947	ENSMUSG00000020460
UniProt	P62979	P62983
RefSeq (mRNA)	NM_002954; NM_001135592; NM_001177413	NM_001033865; NM_024277
RefSeq (protein)	NP_001129064; NP_001170884; NP_002945	NP_001029037; NP_077239
Location (UCSC)	Chr 2: 55.23 – 55.24 Mb	Chr 11: 29.5 – 29.5 Mb
PubMed search
- Wikidata
View/Edit Human	View/Edit Mouse

40S ribosomal protein S27a is a protein that in humans is encoded by the RPS27A gene.

Ubiquitin, a highly conserved protein that has a major role in targeting cellular proteins for degradation by the 26S proteosome, is synthesized as a precursor protein consisting of either polyubiquitin chains or a single ubiquitin fused to an unrelated protein. This gene encodes a fusion protein consisting of ubiquitin at the N terminus and ribosomal protein S27a at the C terminus. When expressed in yeast, the protein is post-translationally processed, generating free ubiquitin monomer and ribosomal protein S27a. Ribosomal protein S27a is a component of the 40S subunit of the ribosome and belongs to the S27AE family of ribosomal proteins. It contains C4-type zinc finger domains and is located in the cytoplasm. Pseudogenes derived from this gene are present in the genome. As with ribosomal protein S27a, ribosomal protein L40 is also synthesized as a fusion protein with ubiquitin; similarly, ribosomal protein S30 is synthesized as a fusion protein with the ubiquitin-like protein fubi.
