= ZG16 =

Available structures
PDB	Ortholog search: PDBe RCSB
PDB	List of PDB id codes 3APA, 3VY6, 3VY7, 3VZE, 3VZF, 3VZG

Identifiers
- Aliases: ZG16, JCLN, JCLN1, ZG16A, zymogen granule protein 16
- External IDs: OMIM: 617311; MGI: 1916286; HomoloGene: 12296; GeneCards: ZG16; OMA:ZG16 - orthologs

Gene location (Human)
Chr.	Chromosome 16 (human)
Band	16p11.2	Start	29,778,256 bp
Band	16p11.2	End	29,782,973 bp

Gene location (Mouse)
Chr.	Chromosome 7 (mouse)
Band	7|7 F3	Start	126,649,328 bp
Band	7|7 F3	End	126,686,500 bp
RNA expression pattern
Bgee	Human / Mouse (ortholog); Top expressed in: mucosa of sigmoid colon; mucosa of ileum; jejunal mucosa; mucosa of transverse colon; rectum; duodenum; cecum; appendix; liver; epithelium of colon / Top expressed in: left colon; Paneth cell; crypt of lieberkuhn of small intestine; duodenum; pyloric antrum; jejunum; intestinal villus; islet of Langerhans; Ileal epithelium; epithelium of stomach; More reference expression data
BioGPS	n/a
Gene ontology
Molecular function	protein binding; carbohydrate binding
Cellular component	Golgi lumen; cytoplasmic vesicle lumen; extracellular region; extracellular matrix; Golgi apparatus; cytoplasmic vesicle; zymogen granule membrane; collagen-containing extracellular matrix; extracellular space
Biological process	protein transport
Sources:Amigo / QuickGO
Orthologs
Species	Human	Mouse
Entrez	653808	69036
Ensembl	ENSG00000174992	ENSMUSG00000049350
UniProt	O60844	Q8K0C5
RefSeq (mRNA)	NM_152338	NM_026918
RefSeq (protein)	NP_689551	NP_081194
Location (UCSC)	Chr 16: 29.78 – 29.78 Mb	Chr 7: 126.65 – 126.69 Mb
PubMed search
- Wikidata
View/Edit Human	View/Edit Mouse

Zymogen Granule Protein 16 is a protein that is encoded by the ZG16 gene. Other common names include hZG16, FLJ43571, FLJ92276, secretory lectin ZG16, jacalin-like lectin domain containing, JCLN, JCLN1, MGC183567, MGC34820, ZG16A, zymogen granule membrane protein 16, zymogen granule protein 16 homolog, and zymogen granule protein. The gene is located on Chromosome 16: 29,778,256-29,782,973. The gene obtains one transcript (one splice variant) and 128 orthologues.

== Function ==
ZG16 enables protein transport, protein trafficking, carbohydrate binding, and peptidoglycan binding. Zymogen Granule Protein 16 also acts as a linker molecule between the secretory proteins in the trans-Golgi network (TGN) and the zymogen granule membrane (ZGM). The protein is located in the Golgi lumen and collagen-containing extracellular matrix. ZG16 is a protein that is highly selective for cytoplasmic expression in mucin-producing goblet cells, which are cells that are located in the gastrointestinal tract. These cells produce mucus to protect mucous membranes that line the surface of our internal organs. The protein is mainly expressed in the human colon, endometrium, and spleen. Small amounts of ZG16 gene expression are also found in the liver and bone marrow.

== Structure ==
The gene length is about 167 amino acids long. The protein existence level is PE1, indicating that the protein is a marker for exocrine pancreatic function. The ligand that ZG16 is able to bind is Lectin. The basal isoelectric point of the protein is 9.43.

The protein mass (Da) is different for the Human ZG16 protein, Mouse ZG16 protein, and the Rat ZG16 Protein.

Table 1. Appropriate Mass in Da for Each Type of ZG16 Protein
Species	Human ZG16 Gene	Mouse ZG16 Gene	Rat ZG16 Gene
Mass (Da)	18147	18210	18213

== Interaction with gram-positive bacteria ==
Cells in our colon obtain bacteria that reside in a mutualistic relationship with our host cells to prevent harmful bacteria from causing inflammation. Our colon obtains two mucus layers: the impenetrable mucus (IM) and penetrable mucus (PM). The IM is classified as a MUC2 mucin polymeric network since it works to build intestinal mucus. The IM is less penetrable than the PM. The ZG16 protein works with the MUC2 network to keep Gram-positive bacteria away from the epithelial cells in the colon. The absence of ZG16 will allow Gram-positive bacteria to enter the epithelial cells and contribute to the production of cancerous cells in the colon. ZG16 and Gram-positive bacteria reside in symbiosis to prevent penetration of harmful Gram-positive bacteria, allowing for bacterial limitation in epithelial cells of the colon.

== Associated diseases ==
ZG16 is associated with these following diseases: Cancer, Colitis, Colonic disease, Episodic Kinesigenic Dyskinesia 1, Crohn's Disease, EEC Syndrome, Spondylocostal Dysostosis, Autoimmune Disease, Benign Familial Infantile Epilepsy, Schizophrenia 3, and Cystic Fibrosis.

=== EEC syndrome ===
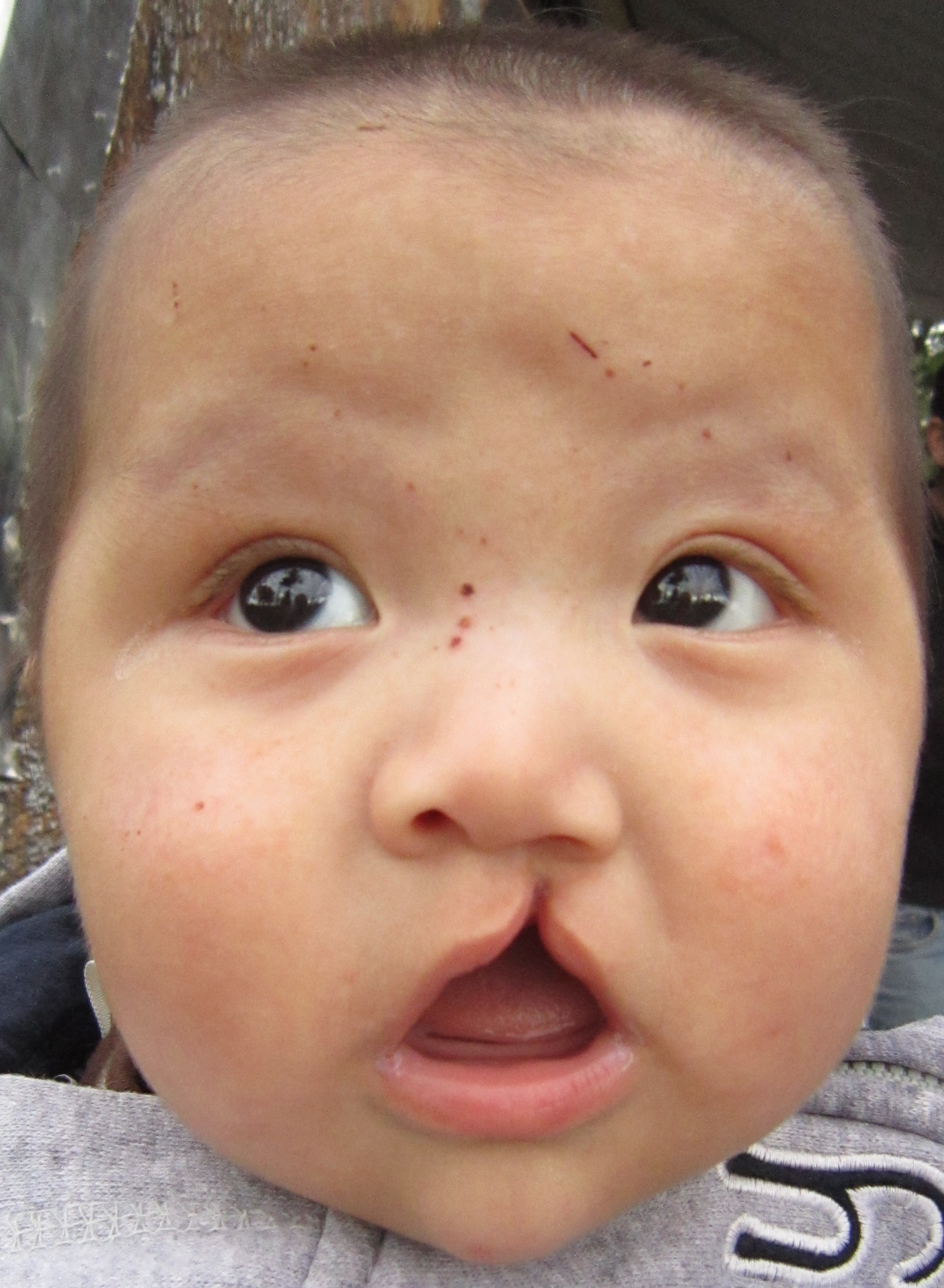
Representation of a common symptom of EEC syndrome, which is Cleft lip/palate syndrome.

Ectrodactyly–ectodermal dysplasia–cleft syndrome (EEC syndrome) is considered to be an autosomal dominant disease. The amount of individuals with this disease is 1 in 90,000 general population. The rare disease can cause abnormalities of the eyes, urinary tract, and hair glands. The physical features of individuals with this disease include missing or irregular fingers and toes, cleft lip, lobster claw hand/foot, carious teeth, thick eyebrows, and distinguishable facial structures. All of these symptoms can be seen individually or all together. There are two types of EEC syndrome: EEC type 3 (EEC3) and EEC type 1 (EEC1). Mutations present on protein coding regions of the ZG16 gene lead to EEC syndrome. Treatment includes assistance from a pedodontics, pediatrician, oral and plastic surgeon, ophthalmologist, and renal specialist.

=== Spondylocostal dysostosis 5 ===
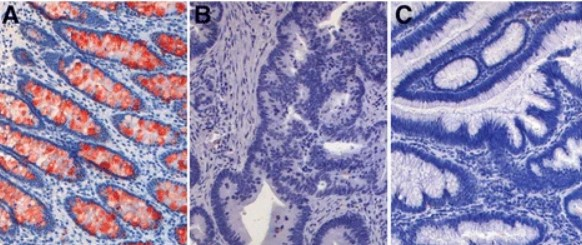
ZG16 expression in (a) Normal Colon Tissue, (b) Adenocarcinoma, and (c) Mucinous Carcinoma. There is high ZG16 gene expression in normal colon tissue and repressed/nonexistent ZG16 gene expression in adenocarcinoma and mucinous carcinoma. Image provided by BMC Cancer.

Spondylocostal dysostosis, which is a sub-class of Jarcho-Levin Syndrome, is caused by abnormal development of spinal bones which leads to segmentation defects on the spinal vertebrae and ribs. The disease is autosomal recessive and can be characterized by these physical features: short trunk in proportion to height, short neck, and non-progressive mild scoliosis. Some individuals may experience respiratory distress as well. Spondylocostal dysostosis 5 is caused by mutations present in the ZG16 gene. These mutations are specifically caused by 16p11.2 proximal deletion syndrome, which occurs when there is a deletion of the p11.2 region of chromosome 16. Treatment for Spondylocostal Dysostosis 5 includes spinal surgery, external bracing with the use of a prosthetic titanium rib, growing rods, and respiratory support.

=== Colorectal Cancer ===
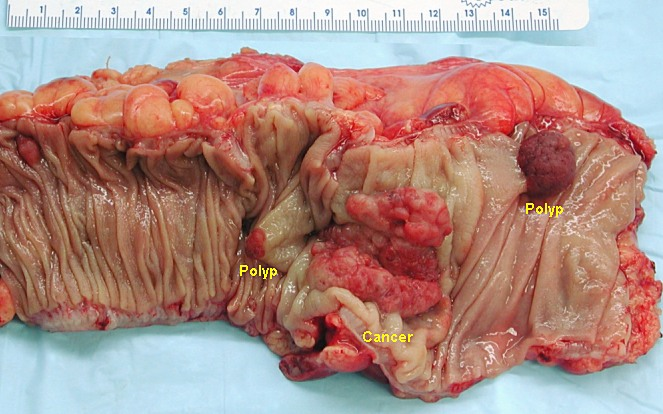
Opened colectomy specimen representing the presence of colorectal cancer.

ZG16 can serve as a biomarker for diagnosis of colorectal cancer (CRC). CRC is a type of cancer where cells in the colon or rectum grow uncontrollably, causing issues to passageways in the anus. CRC is considered to be the third most common cancer diagnosed around the world. ZG16 is one of the most significantly down-regulated genes in CRC tissues. PD-L1 is a type of transmembrane protein that is expressed on tumor-infiltrating cells, such as B or T-cells. Its main function in CRC is to suppress antigen specific T-cells in the lymph nodes. Since PD-L1 proteins are regulated by N-glycosylation, the ZG16 works to bind directly to glycosylated PD-L1 proteins through its lectin domain. This allows the ZG16 protein to promote T-cell activity to fight cancerous colon cells.

To learn more about the association between CRC and ZG16, a RT-PCR was performed on tumor and normal tissue samples of 23 CRC patients. Results showed a suppressed response of the ZG16 gene in the tissue samples of the colon, rectum, and small intestine. The gene was lost in all CRC tissue samples and was suppressed from normal to adenoma to carcinoma, indicating that the gene plays an important role in initiation of CRC.

== Protein interactions ==
- SGTA
- UBQLN
- UBQLN4
- ASPH
- CTNNA3
- GLYCTK
- KCNIP3
- PUF60
- SGTB
- UBE2I
- UBQLN1
- UBQLN2
