= Derlin =

Derlin may refer to:

== Science ==
- A family of membrane proteins
  - Derlin-1 (Degradation in endoplasmic reticulum protein)
  - Derlin-2
  - Derlin-3

== People ==
- Émile Derlin Zinsou (1918-2016), Beninese physician and president of Dahomey (now Benin)
- Bruce Derlin (born 1961), tennis player from New Zealand
- Roberto Derlin (1942–2021), Italian football player and manager

== See also ==
- Delrin, a brand of Polyoxymethylene
