= VHS (disambiguation) =

VHS, or Video Home System, is an analog videocassette recording format.

VHS may also refer to:

- HS Produkt VHS, a Croatian bullpup assault rifle
- Virginia Historical Society, a history museum in Richmond, Virginia, United States
- V/H/S (franchise), a horror film franchise
  - V/H/S, a 2012 horror film
- "VHS", a 2019 song by Thomas Rhett from Center Point Road
- "VHS" (song), a 2021 song by Benjamin Ingrosso and Cherrie
- VHS (album), 2015, by X Ambassadors
- Vanisher, Horizon Scraper, a 2025 album by Quadeca
- VHS protein domain, a part of a protein sequence
- Viral hemorrhagic septicemia, an infectious fish disease
- Vertebral Heart Score, a diagnostic metric in veterinary medicine
