= UBAP1 =

Protein-coding gene in the species Homo sapiens

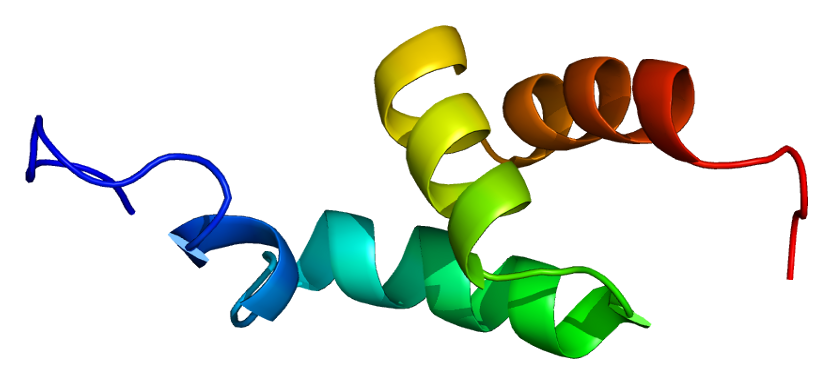

Identifiers
- Aliases: UBAP1, NAG20, UAP, UBAP, UBAP-1, ubiquitin associated protein 1, SPG80
- External IDs: OMIM: 609787; MGI: 2149543; GeneCards: UBAP1
Available structures
PDB	Ortholog search: PDBe RCSB
PDB	List of PDB id codes 1WGN, 4AE4

Gene location (Human)
Chr.	Chromosome 9 (human)
Band	9p13.3	Start	34,179,005 bp
Band	9p13.3	End	34,252,523 bp

Gene location (Mouse)
Chr.	Chromosome 4 (mouse)
Band	4|4 A5	Start	41,348,996 bp
Band	4|4 A5	End	41,390,525 bp
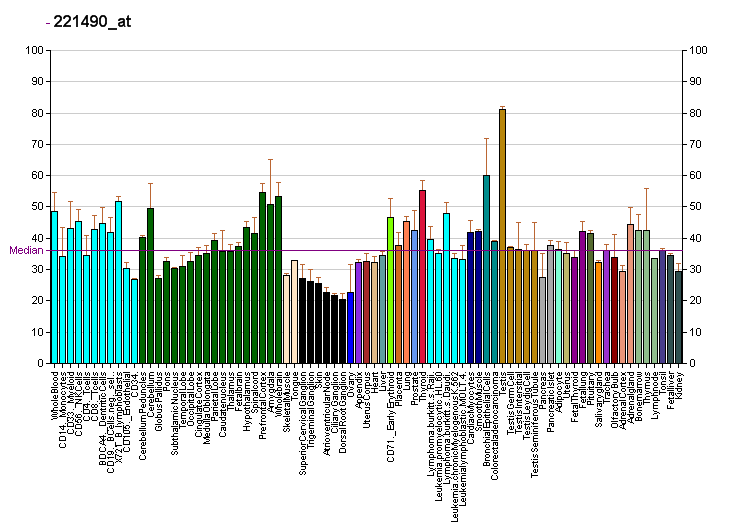

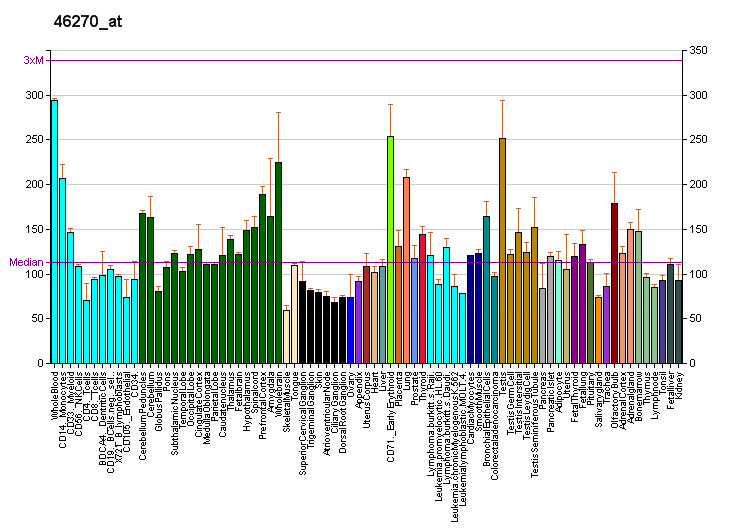
RNA expression pattern
Bgee	Human / Mouse (ortholog); Top expressed in: gastrocnemius muscle; right adrenal cortex; left adrenal gland; left adrenal cortex; muscle of thigh; islet of Langerhans; ventricular zone; ectocervix; blood; tibial arteries / Top expressed in: granulocyte; ventricular zone; muscle of thigh; blood; tail of embryo; duodenum; right kidney; esophagus; neural layer of retina; spermatocyte; More reference expression data
BioGPS	More reference expression data
Gene ontology
Molecular function	ubiquitin binding; protein binding
Cellular component	cytoplasm; cytosol; endosome; plasma membrane; Golgi apparatus; ESCRT I complex; endosome membrane; host cell
Biological process	protein transport; ubiquitin-dependent protein catabolic process via the multivesicular body sorting pathway; endosomal transport; viral life cycle; intracellular transport of virus
Sources:Amigo / QuickGO
Orthologs
Databases	NCBI: entry; OMA: entry
Species	Human	Mouse
Entrez	51271	67123
Ensembl	ENSG00000165006	ENSMUSG00000028437
UniProt	Q9NZ09	Q8BH48
RefSeq (mRNA)	NM_001171201; NM_001171202; NM_001171203; NM_001171204; NM_016525	NM_001290454; NM_023305; NM_001355508; NM_001355509
RefSeq (protein)	NP_001164672; NP_001164673; NP_001164674; NP_001164675; NP_057609	NP_001277383; NP_075794; NP_001342437; NP_001342438
Location (UCSC)	Chr 9: 34.18 – 34.25 Mb	Chr 4: 41.35 – 41.39 Mb
PubMed search
- Wikidata
View/Edit Human	View/Edit Mouse

Ubiquitin-associated protein 1 is a protein that in humans is encoded by the UBAP1 gene.

This gene is a member of the ubiquitin-associated domain (UBA) family, whose members include proteins having connections to ubiquitin and the ubiquitination pathway. The ubiquitin associated domain is thought to be a non-covalent ubiquitin-binding domain consisting of a compact three-helix bundle. This particular protein originates from a gene locus in a refined region on chromosome 9 undergoing loss of heterozygosity in nasopharyngeal carcinoma (NPC). Taking into account its cytogenetic location, this UBA domain family member is being studies as a putative target for mutation in nasopharyngeal carcinomas. Truncating Mutations in UBAP1 Cause Hereditary Spastic Paraplegia.
