= TMEM271 =

Human gene and protein

Identifiers
- Aliases: TMEM271, transmembrane protein 271
- External IDs: GeneCards: TMEM271; OMA:TMEM271 - orthologs

Gene location (Human)
Chr.	Chromosome 4 (human)
Band	4p16.3	Start	573,880 bp
Band	4p16.3	End	576,295 bp
RNA expression pattern
Bgee	Human / Mouse (ortholog); Top expressed in: testicle; gonad; superior frontal gyrus; hippocampus proper; anterior cingulate cortex; nucleus accumbens; Brodmann area 9; temporal lobe; amygdala; right frontal lobe / n/a; More reference expression data
BioGPS	n/a
Orthologs
Species	Human	Mouse
Entrez	112441426	115490131
Ensembl	ENSG00000273238	n/a
UniProt	n a	n/a
RefSeq (mRNA)	NM_001362796	XM_030254964
RefSeq (protein)	n/a	n/a
Location (UCSC)	Chr 4: 0.57 – 0.58 Mb	n/a
PubMed search
- Wikidata
View/Edit Human	View/Edit Mouse

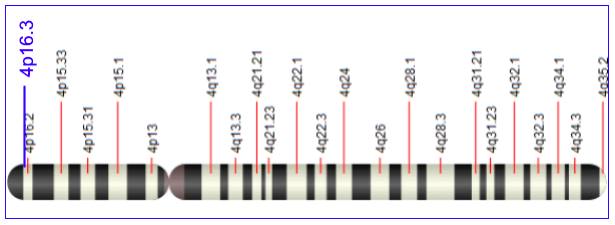
Figure 1: Map of Chromosome 4

Transmembrane protein 271, or TMEM271 is a protein in Homo sapiens encoded by the TMEM271 gene, located at 4p16.3 on the minus strand. The protein is located on the plasma membrane of cells and highly expressed in several regions of the brain.

== Gene ==
=== Locus ===
TMEM271 is located on chromosome 4 on the minus strand at 4p16.3, near the gene associated with Huntington's Disease.

Figure 2: Conceptual translation of TMEM271. The conserved protein domains, motifs, and post-translational modifications are annotated and highlighted within the amino acid sequence. The mRNA sequence is aligned to the protein sequence.

=== Size ===
The gene that encodes TMEM271 is 2,416 nucleotides long. The coding sequence spans from nucleotides 234 to 1391.

== mRNA ==
=== Isoforms ===
The gene has one exon, and a single protein transcript is produced, no isoforms.

== Protein ==
=== Characteristics ===
TMEM271 is 385 amino acids in length, and has a molecular weight of 39.1 kD. It is a basic protein with an estimated isoelectric point is 9.55. It is enriched in alanine, glycine, and arginine residues, and is deficient in methionine, asparagine, threonine, isoleucine, lysine, and glutamine residues.

=== Domains and Motifs ===
TMEM271 has three transmembrane domains at residues 50 to 70, 121 to 141, and 219 to 239, and the first two of these are hydrophobic. An arginine-rich region from residues 248 to 294 correlates with positively charged sequence of the protein.

=== Secondary Structure ===
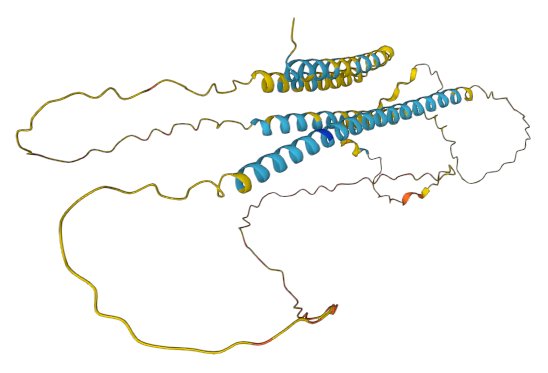
Figure 3: The tertiary structure of the human TMEM271 protein has four alpha helices, as predicted by AlphaFold.

AlphaFold predictive modeling shows four alpha helices located from residues 5 to 37, 45 to 71, 117 to 151, and 199 to 257. These sequences generally align with the transmembrane regions.

=== Tertiary and Quaternary Structure ===
TMEM271 has type 3a topology, meaning that the N-terminus is in the extracellular space. There are no disulfide bridges within the protein. The AlphaFold Database predicts that there are four alpha helices in the human TMEM271 protein.

== Gene-Level Regulation ==
Figure 4: Schematic diagram of the human TMEM271 protein. The topology of the protein is depicted, as are the signal peptide, three transmembrane regions, and nuclear localization signal.

=== Expression Pattern ===
TMEM271 mRNA is found to be expressed highly in the brain, and minimally in the adrenal gland and skin. Within the brain, the highest expression occurs in the cerebral cortex, followed by the hippocampus, amygdala, and basal ganglia. TMEM271 is also included in the CADO-ES1 cell line, a human Ewing's sarcoma cell line that functions in glutamate signaling, regulation of postsynaptic neurotransmitter receptors, and the biological process of learning.

== Protein-Level Regulation ==
=== Sub-cellular Location ===
The sub-cellular location of TMEM271 is predicted to be the plasma membrane, or another membranous organelle such as the endoplasmic reticulum. There is a conserved pattern 7 nuclear localization sequence, with an amino acid sequence of PASRARR, at position 275.

=== Signal Peptide ===
There is a signal peptide at the N-terminus of the protein from residues 1 to 28 with a cleavage site at 28/29, indicating that TMEM271 is a secretory protein and will be transferred to the endoplasmic reticulum during post-translational modification.

=== Post-Translational Modifications ===
There is a cAMP/cGMP dependent kinase (protein kinase A) phosphorylation site at residue 151, a casein kinase II (CK2) phosphorylation site at residue 147, and a protein kinase C (PKC) site at residue 4. There is one amidation site from residues 249 to 252. Lastly, there are two myristoylation sites at residues 7 to 12 and 131 to 136.

=== Interacting Proteins ===
Figure 5: A table of human TMEM271 orthologs.

TMEM271 has no directly interacting proteins. However, it is included in the CADO-ES1 cell line, an Ewing's sarcoma cell line, which functions in glutamate signaling, postsynaptic receptor regulation, and the learning process. One of the neighboring genes encodes another transmembrane proteins, TMEM114, which plays a role in eye development, and is highly expressed in the hypothalamus.

== Homology and Evolution ==
=== Orthologs ===
There are several orthologs for Homo sapiens TMEM271 within mammals, reptiles, aves, and both bony and cartilaginous fishes. Mammalian orthologs have high identity matches with H. sapiens, and are therefore considered strict orthologs. There are more distant orthologs, or homologs, within reptiles, aves, and fishes. The most distant ortholog is Callorhinchus milii, which dates back to 464 million years ago.

== Clinical Significance ==
The TMEM271 protein is not cancer prognostic, but has been detected in gliomas. A study done in June of 2022 included a 17 year old patient with osteosarcoma who had a BRCA1 gene fusion with TMEM271. Another study cited the TMEM271 gene as having increased expression in a tissue with resistance to SP, a lysine-specific demethylase-1 inhibitor drug used to treat Ewing's Sarcoma.
