= Ubiquitin-binding domain =

Type of protein domain

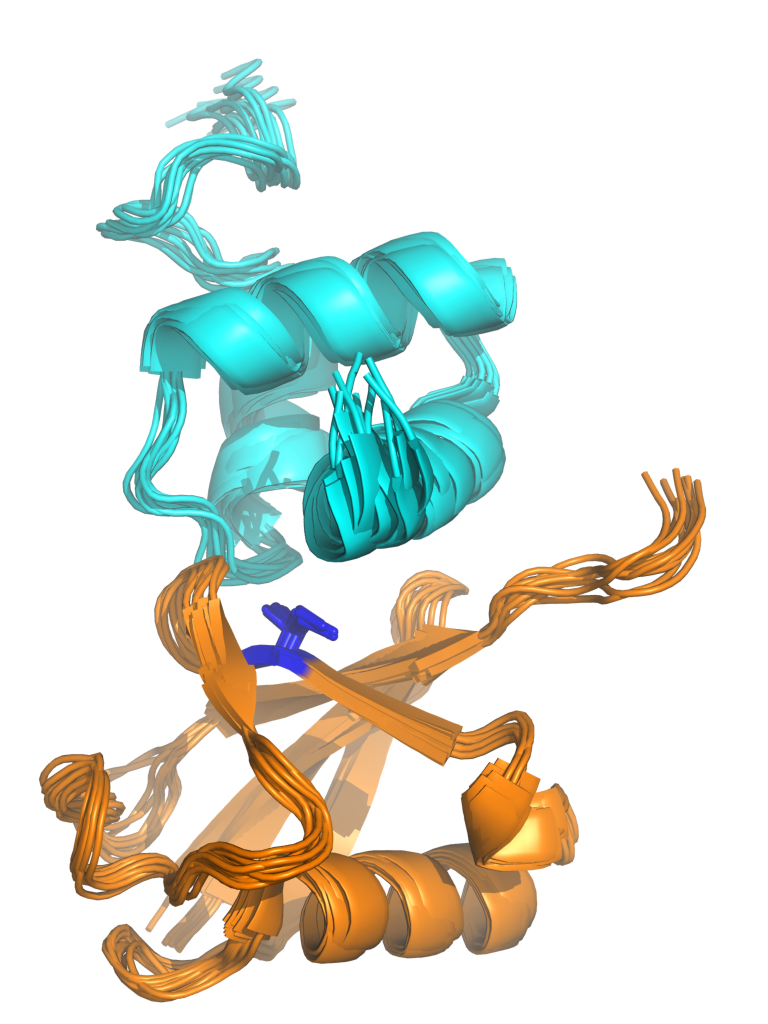
The NMR structure of a UBA domain, among the most common types of ubiquitin-binding domain, from the protein ubiquilin-1 (top, cyan) bound to ubiquitin (bottom, orange). Isoleucine 44, the center of a hydrophobic patch on the ubiquitin surface that interacts with a number of ubiquitin-binding domains, is highlighted in blue. Rendered from PDB: 2JY6.

Ubiquitin-binding domains (UBDs) are protein domains that recognise and bind non-covalently to ubiquitin through protein-protein interactions. As of 2019, a total of 29 types of UBDs had been identified in the human proteome. Most UBDs bind to ubiquitin only weakly, with binding affinities in the low to mid μM range. Proteins containing UBDs are known as ubiquitin-binding proteins or sometimes as "ubiquitin receptors".

== Structure ==
Most UBDs are of small size (often less than 50 amino acids) and adopt many different protein folds from multiple fold classes, including all-alpha, all-beta, and alpha/beta folds. Many UBDs can be roughly classified into four broad categories: alpha-helical structures (in some cases as small as a single helix, as in the ubiquitin-interacting motif); zinc fingers; pleckstrin homology (PH) domains; and domains similar to those in ubiquitin-conjugating (also known as E2) enzymes. Other UBDs not fitting these categories can be SH3 domains, PFU domains, and other structures. Small helical structures are the most common, and examples include ubiquitin-associated domains (UBA), CUE domains, the ubiquitin-interacting motif (UIM), the motif interacting with ubiquitin (MIU), and the VHS protein domain.

== Binding mechanism ==
Many UBDs of the UBA family bind to ubiquitin via a hydrophobic patch centred on a particular isoleucine residue (the "Ile44 patch"), although binding to other surface patches has been observed, for example the "Ile36 patch". Zinc finger UBDs have a broader range of binding modes including interactions with polar residues. Because many UBDs have a common or overlapping ubiquitin interaction surface, their interactions are often mutually exclusive; due to steric clashes, more than one UBD cannot physically interact with the same Ile44-centered hydrophobic patch on a single ubiquitin molecule.

Most UBDs described to date bind to monoubiquitin and thus do not show a linkage-preference for the differently linked ubiquitin chains. There are, however, a handful of known, linkage-specific UBDs, that can specifically differentiate between the eight different ubiquitin linkages. This is important as the different linkage types are thought to signal for different molecular processes and linkage-specific recognition of these chains ensures the appropriate cellular response.
