= Derlin-1 =

Protein involved in retrotranslocation of specific misfolded proteins and in ER stress

DERL1
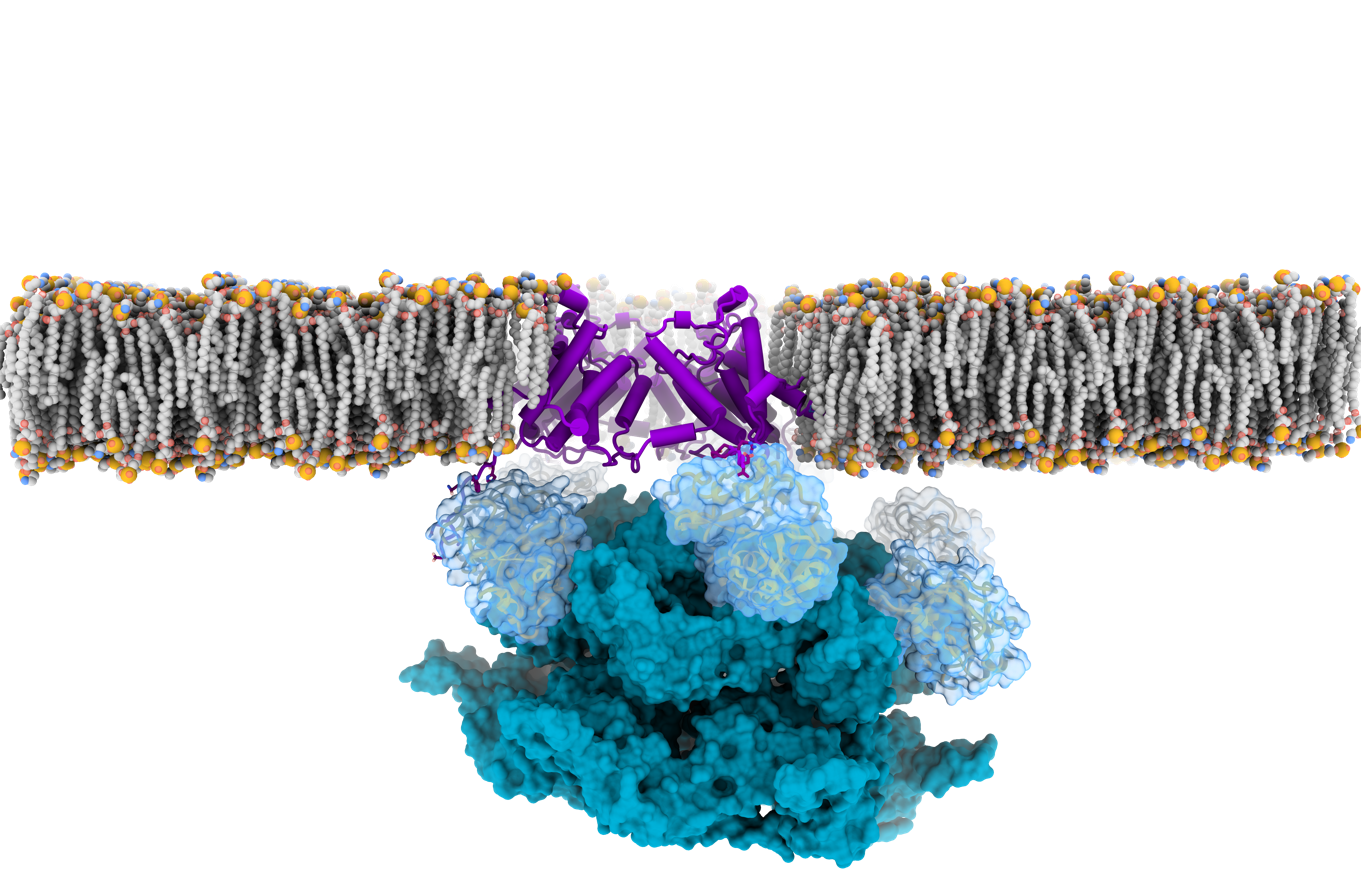

Identifiers
- Aliases: DERL1, DER-1, DER1, derlin 1, derlin-1
- External IDs: OMIM: 608813; MGI: 1915069; GeneCards: DERL1

Gene location (Human)
Chr.	Chromosome 8 (human)
Band	8q24.13	Start	123,013,170 bp
Band	8q24.13	End	123,042,302 bp

Gene location (Mouse)
Chr.	Chromosome 15 (mouse)
Band	15|15 D1	Start	57,732,898 bp
Band	15|15 D1	End	57,755,844 bp
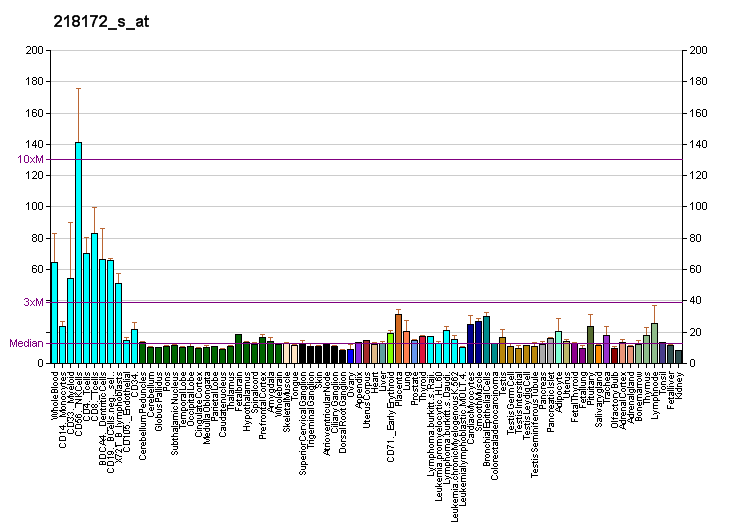

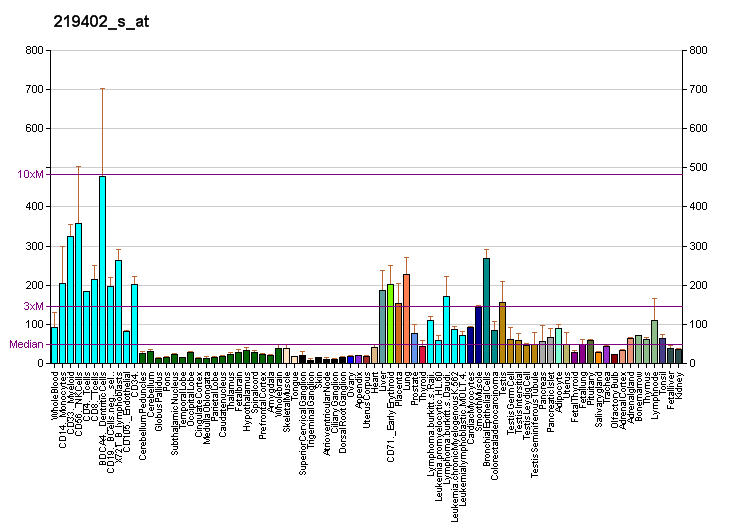
RNA expression pattern
Bgee	Human / Mouse (ortholog); Top expressed in: secondary oocyte; islet of Langerhans; stromal cell of endometrium; tendon of biceps brachii; germinal epithelium; epithelium of nasopharynx; gastrocnemius muscle; sperm; palpebral conjunctiva; tibia / Top expressed in: vestibular membrane of cochlear duct; seminal vesicula; ciliary body; fossa; epithelium of lens; iris; conjunctival fornix; transitional epithelium of urinary bladder; condyle; motor neuron; More reference expression data
BioGPS	More reference expression data
Gene ontology
Molecular function	protein binding; MHC class I protein binding; ubiquitin protein ligase binding; protease binding; ubiquitin-specific protease binding; ATPase binding; signaling receptor activity
Cellular component	early endosome; VCP-NPL4-UFD1 AAA ATPase complex; integral component of endoplasmic reticulum membrane; Derlin-1-VIMP complex; integral component of membrane; late endosome; membrane; Derlin-1 retrotranslocation complex; endoplasmic reticulum; endoplasmic reticulum membrane; signal recognition particle receptor complex; signal recognition particle
Biological process	Unfolded protein response; endoplasmic reticulum unfolded protein response; ERAD pathway; positive regulation of protein binding; protein transport; protein destabilization; retrograde protein transport, ER to cytosol; viral process; ER-associated misfolded protein catabolic process; protein homooligomerization; positive regulation of protein ubiquitination; establishment of protein localization; ubiquitin-dependent ERAD pathway; response to unfolded protein; protein folding; transmembrane transport; protein ubiquitination; transport; proteasome-mediated ubiquitin-dependent protein catabolic process
Sources:Amigo / QuickGO
Orthologs
Databases	NCBI: entry; OMA: entry
Species	Human	Mouse
Entrez	79139	67819
Ensembl	ENSG00000136986	ENSMUSG00000022365
UniProt	Q9BUN8	Q99J56
RefSeq (mRNA)	NM_001134671; NM_024295; NM_001330601; NM_001363963	NM_024207
RefSeq (protein)	NP_001128143; NP_001317530; NP_077271; NP_001350892	NP_077169
Location (UCSC)	Chr 8: 123.01 – 123.04 Mb	Chr 15: 57.73 – 57.76 Mb
PubMed search
- Wikidata
View/Edit Human	View/Edit Mouse

Derlin-1 also known as degradation in endoplasmic reticulum protein 1 is a membrane protein that in humans is encoded by the DERL1 gene. Derlin-1 is located in the membrane of the endoplasmic reticulum (ER) and is involved in retrotranslocation of specific misfolded proteins and in ER stress. Derlin-1 is widely expressed in thyroid, fat, bone marrow and many other tissues. The protein belongs to the Derlin-family proteins (also called derlins) consisting of derlin-1, derlin-2 and derlin-3 that are components in the endoplasmic reticulum-associated protein degradation (ERAD) pathway. The derlins mediate degradation of misfolded lumenal proteins within ER, and are named 'der' for their 'Degradation in the ER'. Derlin-1 is a mammalian homologue of the yeast DER1 protein, a protein involved in the yeast ERAD pathway. Moreover, derlin-1 is a member of the rhomboid-like clan of polytopic membrane proteins.

Overexpression of derlin-1 are associated with many cancers, including colon cancer, breast cancer, bladder cancer and non-small cell lung cancer.

== Discovery ==
In 2004 the DERL1 gene was discovered independently by two research groups when they were exploring the machinery of retrotranslocation in the ER in the cell. One evidence for the existence of DERL1 was provided by Professor Tom A. Rapoport and his research group at Harvard Medical School, Boston, Massachusetts. Another evidence of the DERL1 gene was discovered by Professor Hidde L. Ploegh and his research group who is also at Harvard Medical School, Boston, Massachusetts. As the mammalian DERL1 gene was found to be a homologue of the yeast DER1 gene found in 1996, it was named after the yeast gene.

== Gene location ==
The human DERL1 gene is located on the long (q) arm of chromosome 8 at region 2 band 4, from base pair 123,013,164 to 123,042,423 (Build GRCh37/hg19) (map).

== Function and mechanism ==
=== Rerouting factor during ER stress ===
ER stress is caused by an accumulation of unfolded or misfolded proteins in ER and is critical for cell function. The accumulation of unfolded and misfolded proteins activates an unfolded protein response (UPR) which regulate the homeostasis of the cell. One of the strategies cells possess to ER stress as a quality control system is the ERAD pathway, by which Derlin-1 is a component of. As a part of an ER membrane protein complex (that includes VIMP, SEL1, HRD1, and HERP) derlin-1 detects misfolded proteins in ER and mediate them for their degradation in the ERAD pathway.

Under ER stress, the carboxyl-terminus region of derlin-1 captures specific misfolded proteins in the ER lumen. Derlin-1 also interacts with VIMP, an ER membrane protein that recruits the cytosolic ATPase p97 and its cofactor. The interaction of derlin-1 with p97 via VIMP is essential for export of misfolded proteins. p97 is required for the transport of the misfolded proteins through the ER membrane and back to the cytosolic side for their degradation. This process is referred to as retrotranslocation. Hence, one of the functions of derlin-1 is to reroute specific misfolded protein to the cytosol for their degradation. Prior to the cytosolic degradation, the retrotranslocated misfolded proteins interacts with HRDI E3 ubiquitin ligase. This ligase ubiquitinates the misfolded proteins promoting their degradation in the cytosol by the ubiquitin-protease system (UPS). Currently, the molecular mechanism by which derlin-1 reroutes the misfolded proteins from ER to their degradation are not fully understood.

=== The structure of derlin-1 ===
The cryo-EM analysis revealed that human Derlin-1 forms a tetrameric channel across the ER membrane. Derlin-1 channel holds a short, large transmembrane funnel in the center of tetramer with a diameter about 11-13 angstrom, which might serve as a permeation pathway for misfolded protein substrates in ERAD. Each protomer in human Derlin-1 tetramer shares a high structural similarity with yeast DER1 protein or other rhomboid members. However, this channel architecture makes human derlin-1 different from other known rhomboid structures and implies its centraal role in mammalian ERAD retrotranslocation. Further structural studies showed that Derlin-1 tetramer could form a ERAD complex with AAA ATPase p97, and the conformation of Derlin-1 channel could be changed upon the ATP hydrolysis in p97 from a trans-ER membrane channel into a U-shaped half channel with an open to the lipidic environment of ER membrane. This complex structure suggests that the retrotranslocation activity of Derlin-1 could be powered by p97.

== Clinical significance ==
Derlin 1 (DERL1) is up-regulated in metastatic canine mammary tumors as part of the unfolded protein response.

== Interactions ==
Derlin-1 has been shown to interact with the following proteins:

- HRD1
- VIMP
- US11

== See also ==
- Derlin-2
- Derlin-3
