= UBAP2 =

Protein-coding gene in the species Homo sapiens

Identifiers
- Aliases: UBAP2, UBAP-2, ubiquitin associated protein 2
- External IDs: MGI: 1916176; GeneCards: UBAP2

Gene location (Human)
Chr.	Chromosome 9 (human)
Band	9p13.3	Start	33,921,693 bp
Band	9p13.3	End	34,048,949 bp

Gene location (Mouse)
Chr.	Chromosome 4 (mouse)
Band	4|4 A5	Start	41,194,313 bp
Band	4|4 A5	End	41,275,144 bp
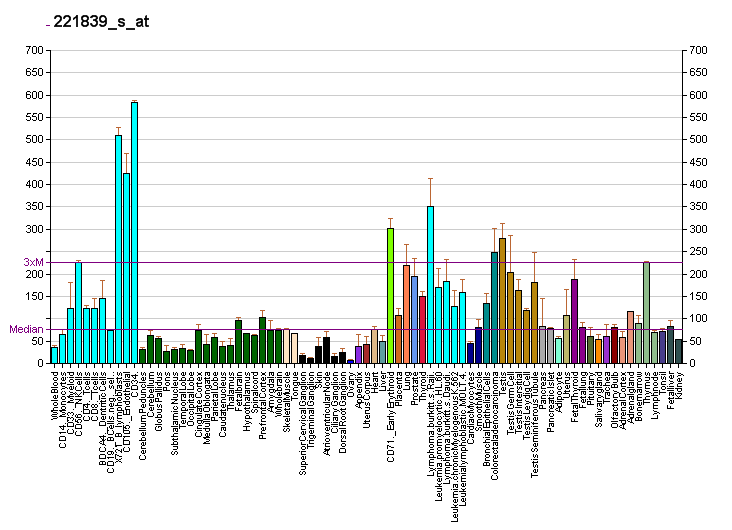

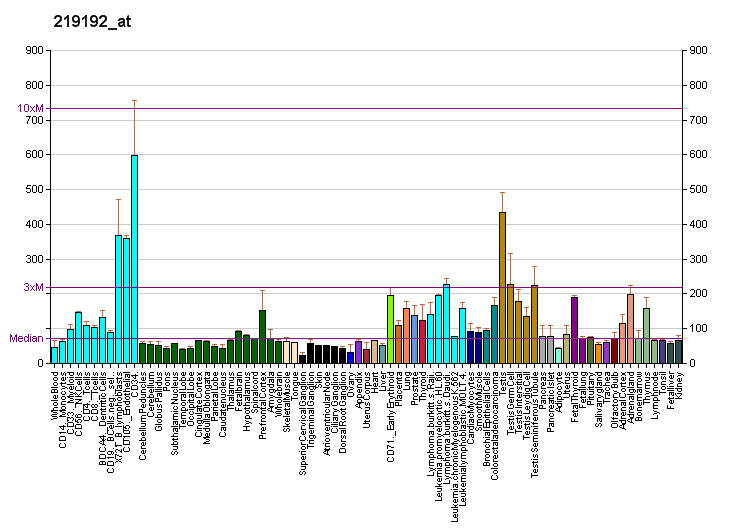
RNA expression pattern
Bgee	Human / Mouse (ortholog); Top expressed in: sperm; pancreatic ductal cell; vastus lateralis muscle; gonad; Skeletal muscle tissue of biceps brachii; secondary oocyte; Achilles tendon; Skeletal muscle tissue of rectus abdominis; body of tongue; sural nerve / Top expressed in: tail of embryo; genital tubercle; zygote; Ileal epithelium; secondary oocyte; yolk sac; muscle of thigh; seminiferous tubule; epiblast; otic vesicle; More reference expression data
BioGPS	More reference expression data
Gene ontology
Molecular function	RNA binding; cadherin binding
Cellular component	nucleus; cytoplasm
Biological process	positive regulation of gene expression
Sources:Amigo / QuickGO
Orthologs
Databases	NCBI: entry; OMA: entry
Species	Human	Mouse
Entrez	55833	68926
Ensembl	ENSG00000137073	ENSMUSG00000028433
UniProt	Q5T6F2	Q91VX2
RefSeq (mRNA)	NM_020867; NM_001282529; NM_001282530; NM_018449	NM_026872
RefSeq (protein)	NP_001269459; NP_060919; NP_001356988; NP_001356991; NP_001356993 NP_001356995; NP_001356996; NP_001356997	NP_081148
Location (UCSC)	Chr 9: 33.92 – 34.05 Mb	Chr 4: 41.19 – 41.28 Mb
PubMed search
- Wikidata
View/Edit Human	View/Edit Mouse

Ubiquitin-associated protein 2 is a protein that in humans is encoded by the UBAP2 gene.

== Function ==
This gene is a novel gene isolated based on its expression in the human adrenal gland. The full-length protein encoded by this gene contains a UBA-domain (ubiquitin associated domain), which is a motif found in several proteins having connections to ubiquitin and the ubiquitination pathway. In addition, the protein contains a region similar to a domain found in members of the atrophin-1 family. The function of this protein has not been determined. Additional alternate splice variants may exist, but their full length nature has not been determined.
