= UBD =

UBD may refer to:

- UBD Street Directory
- Ubiquitin D, encoded by the UBD gene
- Ubiquitin-binding domain, a protein domain
- Underbalanced drilling
- Understanding by Design
- United Baltic Duchy
- University of Brunei Darussalam, in Brunei
- Ur Airlines
- Use by date
