= TMCO6 =

Protein-coding gene in the species Homo sapiens

Identifiers
- Aliases: TMCO6, PRO1580, transmembrane and coiled-coil domains 6
- External IDs: MGI: 1919233; GeneCards: TMCO6

Gene location (Human)
Chr.	Chromosome 5 (human)
Band	5q31.3	Start	140,639,435 bp
Band	5q31.3	End	140,645,408 bp

Gene location (Mouse)
Chr.	Chromosome 18 (mouse)
Band	18|18 B2	Start	36,868,092 bp
Band	18|18 B2	End	36,875,450 bp
RNA expression pattern
Bgee	Human / Mouse (ortholog); Top expressed in: sural nerve; right lobe of liver; right adrenal gland; right uterine tube; left adrenal cortex; right adrenal cortex; left ovary; mucosa of transverse colon; granulocyte; right ovary / Top expressed in: granulocyte; ventricular zone; secondary oocyte; transitional epithelium of urinary bladder; muscle of thigh; neural layer of retina; right kidney; genital tubercle; lip; yolk sac; More reference expression data
BioGPS	n/a
Gene ontology
Molecular function	protein binding; nuclear import signal receptor activity
Cellular component	integral component of membrane; membrane; intracellular anatomical structure
Biological process	protein import into nucleus
Sources:Amigo / QuickGO
Orthologs
Databases	NCBI: entry; OMA: entry
Species	Human	Mouse
Entrez	55374	71983
Ensembl	ENSG00000113119	ENSMUSG00000006850
UniProt	Q96DC7	Q8BQX5
RefSeq (mRNA)	NM_001300980; NM_001300982; NM_018502	NM_028036
RefSeq (protein)	NP_001287909; NP_001287911; NP_060972	NP_082312
Location (UCSC)	Chr 5: 140.64 – 140.65 Mb	Chr 18: 36.87 – 36.88 Mb
PubMed search
- Wikidata
View/Edit Human	View/Edit Mouse

Transmembrane and coiled-coil domain 6, TMCO6, is a protein that in humans is encoded by the TMCO6 gene with aliases of PRO1580, HQ1580 or FLJ39769.1.

== Gene ==
The human TMCO6 is found on chromosome 5 (position 5q31.3). The entire gene spans 5568 base pairs on the positive strand of chromosome 5 (140019113-140024689bp) but is alternately spliced into different variants. There are three known variants for TMCO6. Variant 1 is the longest and variant 2 and 3 are spliced into shorter mRNA strands. There is also a predicted variants X1-X7.

=== Expression ===
TMCO6 is expressed in liver tissue and is found during the fetal stage of development in humans.

== Homology ==
Orthologs of the TMCO6 protein have been found among sequenced organisms with the exception of invertebrates, fungi, plants and bacteria. Tmco6 (transmembrane and coiled-coil domains 6) - Rat Genome Database. This includes close primates to some distant fish. Graphs show the evolutionary rate of TMCO6 with respect to different species and compared to other proteins. It is concluded that TMCO6 is a fairly fast evolving protein, similar to fibrinogen.

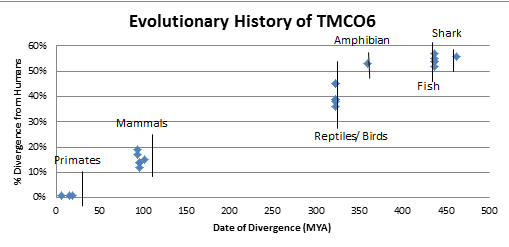
Evolutionary history of TMCO6 is show with respect to different organisms.

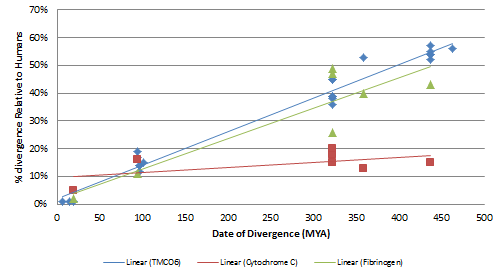
The evolutionary rate of TMCO6 (blue) is compared to a relatively fast evolving fibrinogen protein (green) and cytochrom c (red) that is relatively slow evolving.

== Transcription ==
There are four known isoforms associated with this gene/protein (1, 2, 3 and X2). The longest variant of TMCO6 is variant 1, encoded by a 12-exon long, 1,925 base pair mRNA sequence. Variant 2 is the second longest at 1,907 base pairs in length and also consists of 12 exons. This transcript variant has an alternate splice site in the central coding region that does not alter the reading frame. Variant 3 has a total length of 1,614 base pairs and differs from variant 1 because it lacks two consecutive exons. It has an alternative splice site in the 5’ region that causes the translation to initiate downstream at an in frame AUG. Variant X2 is predicted using computational analysis and is 1,892 base pairs in length.

== Protein ==
The TMCO6 protein is found in the membrane and is considered a multi-pass membrane protein. There is evidence of its presence in the nucleus, cytosol, ER, mitochondria and the plasma membrane. The predicted molecular weight of Isoform 1 in humans, but is conserved, is 55kDa. Variant 1 is translated into a 499 amino acid sequence isoform. Isoform 2, encoded by transcript variant 2, is 493 amino acids in length and has a predicted molecular weight of 54 kDa. Transcript variant 3 encodes isoform 3 which is the shortest protein because of its spliced N-terminus. Isoform 3 is 253 amino acids in length with a molecular weight of 28kDa.

=== Domains and motifs ===
Evidence of two reserved ARM superfamily domains are shown in the TMCO6 protein. The ARM domain, Armadillo/ beta-catenin-like-repeat, is about a 40 amino acid long tandem repeat that forms superhelix of helices. Another feature is that TMCO6 has an Arginine rich region that is within the coil-coiled region. This indicates that the Arg rich area might be an important structural feature of the coiled-coil region. There are 17 regions for protein binding, 2 transmembrane domains and an addition of a poly-A tail to the mRNA. An SRP1 is also found from the 23-399 amino acids. The SRP1 domain is Karyopherin(importin) alpha. This is involved in the exchange of molecules from the nucleus and the cytoplasm. The exchange involves the active transport by a carrier protein called karyopherins. A di-leucine motif is also abundant in TMCO6. This motif is commonly known to be a lysosome targeting motif. A nuclear localization sequence of 5 positive amino acids is found near the 5' end indicating its transport to the nucleus.

=== Structure ===
The 5' and 3' end of TMCO6 is predicted to be located on the cytoplasmic side of the membrane. There is a small portion located in the non-cytoplasmic side.

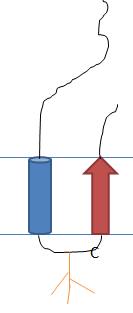
TMCO6 Protein

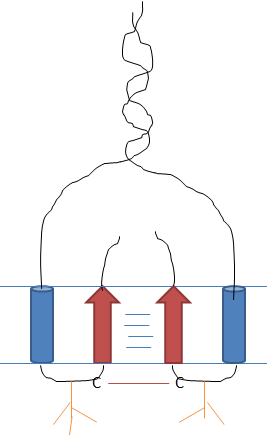
Possible homodimer formation with coiling of N-termini

Secondary Structure of TMCO6. Cartoon of the TMCO6 protein with two transmembrane domains, one beta-sheet and one alpha-helix. There is also a glycosylation site and a cystine residue. Both N and C terminals are found in the cytosol region.

== Function ==
Function of the conserved ARM domain and SRP1 domains are known. The ARM domains play a role in mediating the interaction of beta-catenin with its ligand. They are responsible for transduction of the Wnt signal, intracellular signaling and cytoskeletal regulation. The SRP1 domain encodes alpha-Karyopherin (importin) and is known for intracellular trafficking and secretion on the membrane. TMCO6 is thought to be involved in the transport of molecules through the nuclear membrane.

== Interactions ==
Two-hybrid experimental evidence suggests UBQLN1, or ubiquilin 1, has a high potential to interact with TMCO6.
