= Membrane topology =

Topology of a transmembrane protein refers to locations of N- and C-termini of membrane-spanning polypeptide chain with respect to the inner or outer sides of the biological membrane occupied by the protein.

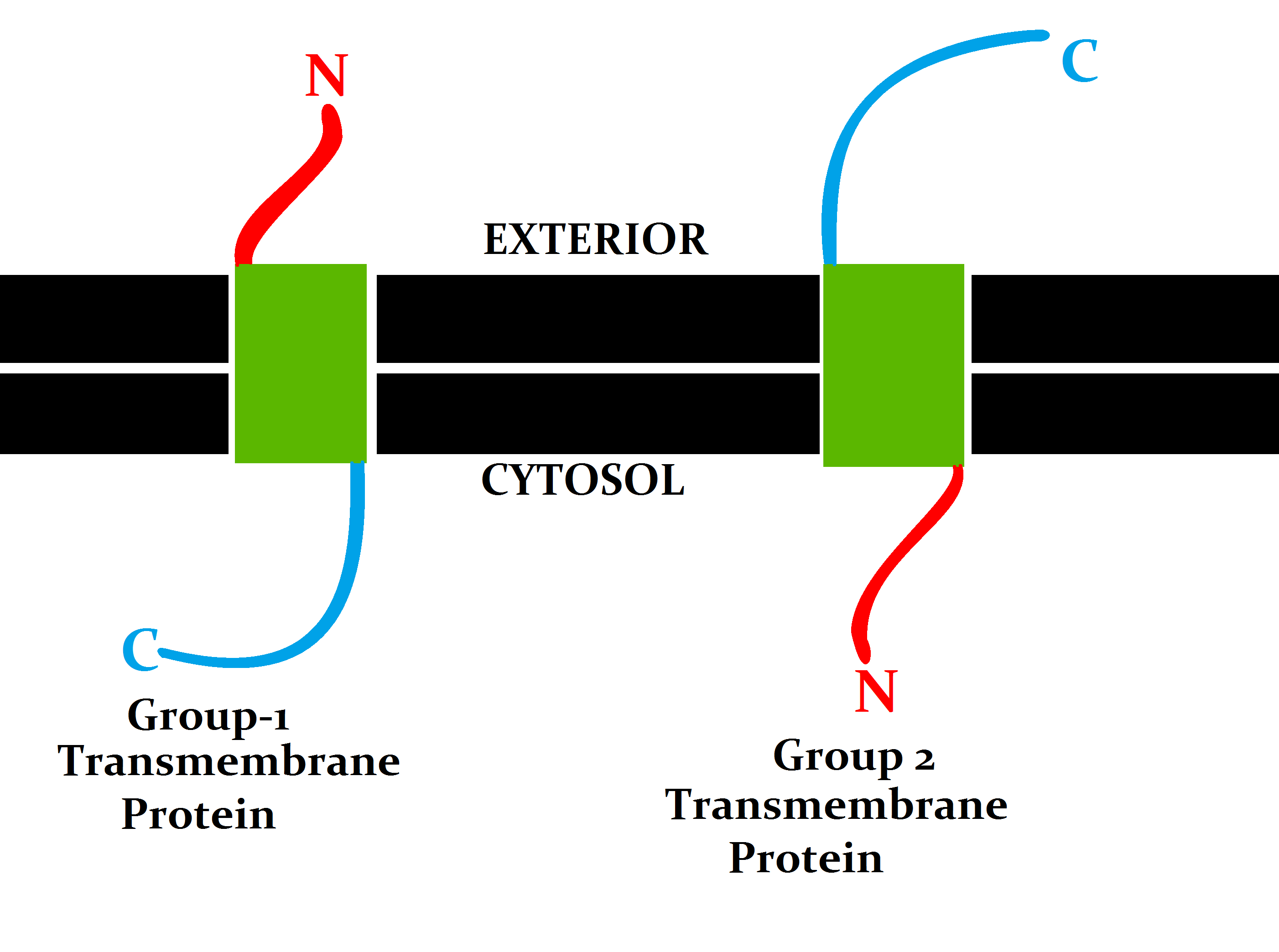
Group I and II transmembrane proteins have opposite final topologies. Group I proteins have the N terminus on the far side and C terminus on the cytosolic side. Group II proteins have the C terminus on the far side and N terminus in the cytosol. However final topology is not the only criterion for defining transmembrane protein groups, rather location of topogenic determinants and mechanism of assembly is considered in the classification

Several databases provide experimentally determined topologies of membrane proteins. They include Uniprot, TOPDB, OPM, and ExTopoDB. There is also a database of domains located conservatively on a certain side of membranes, TOPDOM.

Several computational methods were developed, with a limited success, for predicting transmembrane alpha-helices and their topology. Pioneer methods utilized the fact that membrane-spanning regions contain more hydrophobic residues than other parts of the protein, however applying different hydrophobic scales altered the prediction results. Later, several statistical methods were developed to improve the topography prediction and a special alignment method was introduced. According to the positive-inside rule, cytosolic loops near the lipid bilayer contain more positively-charged amino acids. Applying this rule resulted in the first topology prediction methods. There is also a negative-outside rule in transmembrane alpha-helices from single-pass proteins, although negatively charged residues are rarer than positively charged residues in transmembrane segments of proteins. As more structures were determined, machine learning algorithms appeared. Supervised learning methods are trained on a set of experimentally determined structures, however, these methods highly depend on the training set. Unsupervised learning methods are based on the principle that topology depends on the maximum divergence of the amino acid distributions in different structural parts. It was also shown that locking a segment location based on prior knowledge about the structure improves the prediction accuracy. This feature has been added to some of the existing prediction methods. The most recent methods use consensus prediction (i.e. they use several algorithms to determine the final topology) and automatically incorporate previously determined experimental informations. HTP database provides a collection of topologies that are computationally predicted for human transmembrane proteins.

Discrimination of signal peptides and transmembrane segments is an additional problem in topology prediction treated with a limited success by different methods. Both signal peptides and transmembrane segments contain hydrophobic regions which form α-helices. This causes the cross-prediction between them, which is a weakness of many transmembrane topology predictors. By predicting signal peptides and transmembrane helices simultaneously (Phobius), the errors caused by cross-prediction are reduced and the performance is substantially increased. Another feature used to increase the accuracy of the prediction is the homology (PolyPhobius).”

It is also possible to predict beta-barrel membrane proteins' topology.

== See also ==
- Endomembrane system
- Integral membrane protein
- Protein topology
- Structural biology
- Transmembrane domain
