= SELENOS =

Protein-coding gene found in humans

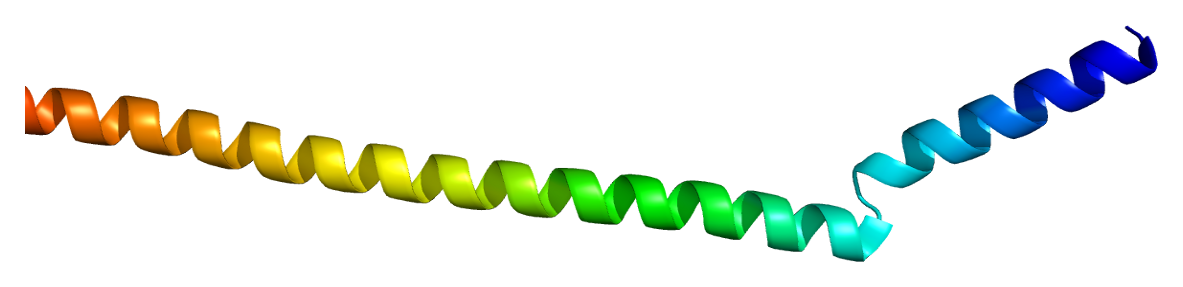

Identifiers
- Aliases: SELENOS, ADO15, SBBI8, SELS, SEPS1, AD-015, VIMP, VCP interacting membrane selenoprotein, selenoprotein S
- External IDs: OMIM: 607918; MGI: 95994; GeneCards: SELENOS
Available structures
| PDB | Ortholog search: PDBe RCSB |
| PDB | List of PDB id codes 2Q2F |

Gene location (Human)
| Chr. | Chromosome 15 (human) |
| Band | 15q26.3 | Start | 101,270,817 bp |
| Band | 15q26.3 | End | 101,277,500 bp |

Gene location (Mouse)
| Chr. | Chromosome 7 (mouse) |
| Band | 7 C|7 35.49 cM | Start | 65,729,397 bp |
| Band | 7 C|7 35.49 cM | End | 65,739,153 bp |
RNA expression pattern
| Bgee | Human / Mouse (ortholog); Top expressed in: mucosa of ileum; skin of arm; myocardium of left ventricle; mucosa of sigmoid colon; jejunal mucosa; cartilage tissue; tibialis anterior muscle; parotid gland; rectum; duodenum / Top expressed in: lacrimal gland; seminal vesicula; Epithelium of choroid plexus; Paneth cell; conjunctival fornix; salivary gland; utricle; crypt of lieberkuhn of small intestine; parotid gland; spermatocyte; More reference expression data |
| BioGPS | n/a |
Gene ontology
| Molecular function | ATPase binding; antioxidant activity; protein binding; enzyme binding; ubiquitin-specific protease binding; signaling receptor activity |
| Cellular component | cytoplasm; integral component of membrane; membrane; Derlin-1-VIMP complex; plasma membrane; very-low-density lipoprotein particle; integral component of endoplasmic reticulum membrane; endoplasmic reticulum; low-density lipoprotein particle; Derlin-1 retrotranslocation complex; cytoplasmic microtubule; endoplasmic reticulum membrane |
| Biological process | negative regulation of endoplasmic reticulum stress-induced intrinsic apoptotic signaling pathway; regulation of gluconeogenesis; establishment of protein localization; negative regulation of interleukin-6 production; response to glucose; negative regulation of glycogen biosynthetic process; cell redox homeostasis; ER overload response; response to redox state; endoplasmic reticulum unfolded protein response; negative regulation of glucose import; retrograde protein transport, ER to cytosol; negative regulation of macrophage apoptotic process; ubiquitin-dependent ERAD pathway; cellular response to insulin stimulus; regulation of nitric oxide metabolic process; cellular response to oxidative stress; negative regulation of tumor necrosis factor production; negative regulation of acute inflammatory response to antigenic stimulus; cellular response to lipopolysaccharide; intracellular protein transport; negative regulation of inflammatory response; negative regulation of nitric-oxide synthase biosynthetic process; cellular oxidant detoxification; protein ubiquitination |
Sources:Amigo / QuickGO
Orthologs
| Databases | NCBI: entry; OMA: entry |
| Species | Human | Mouse |
| Entrez | 55829 | 109815 |
| Ensembl | ENSG00000131871 | ENSMUSG00000075701 |
| UniProt | Q9BQE4 | Q9BCZ4 |
| RefSeq (mRNA) | NM_203472; NM_018445 | NM_024439; NM_001348246 |
| RefSeq (protein) | NP_060915; NP_982298 | NP_001335175; NP_077759 |
| Location (UCSC) | Chr 15: 101.27 – 101.28 Mb | Chr 7: 65.73 – 65.74 Mb |
| PubMed search |
- Wikidata
| View/Edit Human | View/Edit Mouse |

Selenoprotein S is a protein that in humans is encoded by the gene SELENOS (previously SELS).

This gene encodes a selenoprotein, which contains a selenocysteine (Sec) residue at its active site. The selenocysteine is encoded by the UGA codon that normally signals translation termination. The 3' UTR of selenoprotein genes have a common stem-loop structure, the sec insertion sequence (SECIS), that is necessary for the recognition of UGA as a Sec codon rather than as a stop signal. Studies suggest that this protein may regulate cytokine production, and thus play a key role in the control of the inflammatory response. Two alternatively spliced transcript variants encoding the same protein have been found for this gene.

== Interactions ==
SELS (gene) has been shown to interact with Valosin-containing protein.
