= UBQLN2 =

Protein-coding gene in the species Homo sapiens

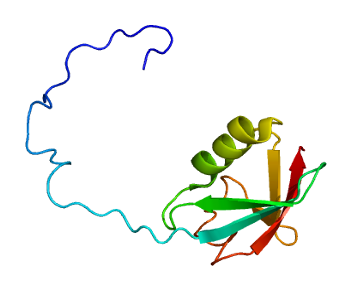

Identifiers
- Aliases: UBQLN2, ALS15, CHAP1, DSK2, N4BP4, PLIC2, HRIHFB2157, ubiquilin 2
- External IDs: OMIM: 300264; MGI: 1860283; GeneCards: UBQLN2
Available structures
PDB	Ortholog search: PDBe RCSB
PDB	List of PDB id codes 1J8C

Gene location (Human)
Chr.	X chromosome (human)
Band	Xp11.21	Start	56,563,627 bp
Band	Xp11.21	End	56,567,868 bp

Gene location (Mouse)
Chr.	X chromosome (mouse)
Band	X|X F3	Start	152,281,223 bp
Band	X|X F3	End	152,284,566 bp
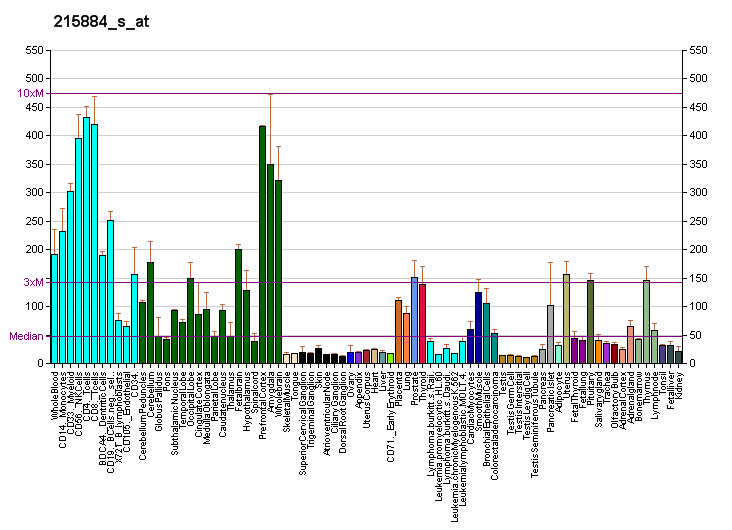
RNA expression pattern
Bgee	Human / Mouse (ortholog); Top expressed in: cerebellar vermis; pons; postcentral gyrus; endothelial cell; Brodmann area 23; retinal pigment epithelium; entorhinal cortex; superior vestibular nucleus; seminal vesicula; middle temporal gyrus / Top expressed in: habenula; ventral tegmental area; arcuate nucleus; median eminence; subiculum; seminal vesicula; paraventricular nucleus of hypothalamus; anterior amygdaloid area; ventromedial nucleus; dorsomedial hypothalamic nucleus; More reference expression data
BioGPS	More reference expression data
Gene ontology
Molecular function	protein binding; polyubiquitin modification-dependent protein binding
Cellular component	cytoplasm; autophagosome; plasma membrane; cytoplasmic vesicle; nucleus; membrane; cytosol
Biological process	autophagy; regulation of autophagosome assembly; negative regulation of G protein-coupled receptor internalization; regulation of macroautophagy; ubiquitin-dependent ERAD pathway; negative regulation of clathrin-dependent endocytosis; positive regulation of ER-associated ubiquitin-dependent protein catabolic process; autophagosome assembly; ubiquitin-dependent protein catabolic process
Sources:Amigo / QuickGO
Orthologs
Databases	NCBI: entry; OMA: entry
Species	Human	Mouse
Entrez	29978	54609
Ensembl	ENSG00000188021	ENSMUSG00000050148
UniProt	Q9UHD9	Q9QZM0
RefSeq (mRNA)	NM_013444	NM_018798
RefSeq (protein)	NP_038472	NP_061268
Location (UCSC)	Chr X: 56.56 – 56.57 Mb	Chr X: 152.28 – 152.28 Mb
PubMed search
- Wikidata
View/Edit Human	View/Edit Mouse

Ubiquilin-2 is a protein that in humans is encoded by the UBQLN2 gene.

== Function ==
This gene encodes a ubiquitin-like protein (ubiquilin) that shares high degree of similarity with related products in yeast, rat and frog. Ubiquilins contain a N-terminal ubiquitin-like domain and a C-terminal ubiquitin-associated domain. They physically associate with both proteasomes and ubiquitin ligases, and are thus thought to functionally link the ubiquitination machinery to the proteasome to effect in vivo protein degradation. This ubiquilin has also been shown to bind the ATPase domain of the Hsp70-like Hspa13 (Stch) protein.

== Similarity to other proteins ==
Human UBQLN2 shares a high degree of similarity with related ubiquilins including UBQLN1 and UBQLN4.

== Clinical significance ==
In a small proportion of familial amyotrophic lateral sclerosis (fALS), the UBQLN2 gene is mutated, causing formation of a non-functional Ubiquilin 2 enzyme. This non-functioning enzyme leads to the accumulation of ubiquitinated proteins in the lower motor neurons and upper corticospinal motor neurons, due to the fact that ubiquilin 2 normally degrades these ubiquinated proteins, but cannot if the ALS mutation is present. The same accumulations occur in patients without UBQLN2 mutations, but with mutations in other genes, including TDP-43 and C9ORF72.

== Interactions ==
UBQLN2 has been shown to interact with HERPUD1 and UBE3A.
