= HERPUD1 =

Protein-coding gene in the species Homo sapiens

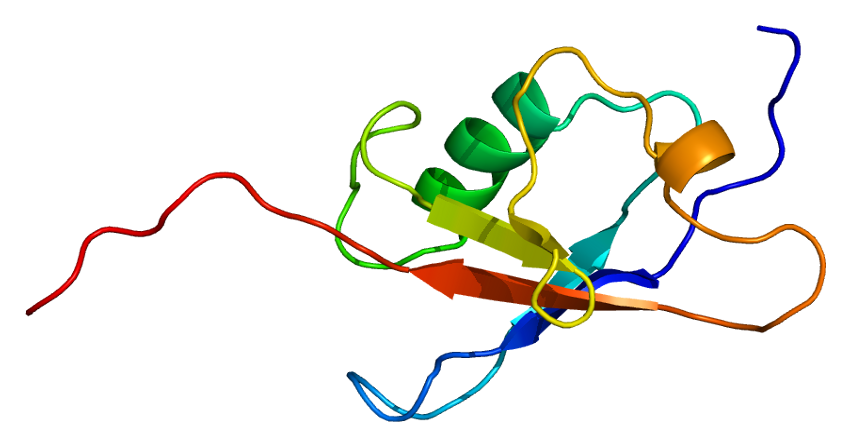
Available structures
PDB	Ortholog search: PDBe RCSB
PDB	List of PDB id codes 1WGD

Identifiers
- Aliases: HERPUD1, HERP, Mif1, SUP, homocysteine inducible ER protein with ubiquitin like domain 1
- External IDs: OMIM: 608070; MGI: 1927406; HomoloGene: 40973; GeneCards: HERPUD1; OMA:HERPUD1 - orthologs

Gene location (Human)
Chr.	Chromosome 16 (human)
Band	16q13	Start	56,932,142 bp
Band	16q13	End	56,944,864 bp

Gene location (Mouse)
Chr.	Chromosome 8 (mouse)
Band	8|8 C5	Start	95,113,066 bp
Band	8|8 C5	End	95,122,005 bp
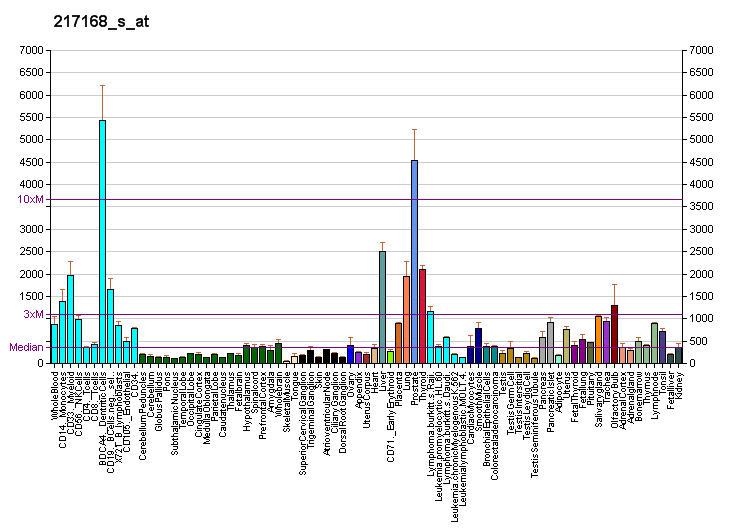
RNA expression pattern
Bgee	Human / Mouse (ortholog); Top expressed in: body of pancreas; palpebral conjunctiva; epithelium of nasopharynx; tonsil; trachea; tibia; parietal pleura; rectum; olfactory bulb; pylorus / Top expressed in: lacrimal gland; parotid gland; right kidney; seminal vesicula; submandibular gland; left lobe of liver; islet of Langerhans; pyloric antrum; calvaria; gallbladder; More reference expression data
BioGPS	More reference expression data
Gene ontology
Molecular function	transmembrane transporter binding; protein binding; molecular function; ubiquitin ligase-substrate adaptor activity
Cellular component	integral component of membrane; Lewy body core; calcium channel complex; endoplasmic reticulum membrane; membrane; endoplasmic reticulum
Biological process	negative regulation of endoplasmic reticulum stress-induced intrinsic apoptotic signaling pathway; negative regulation of cysteine-type endopeptidase activity involved in apoptotic process; ubiquitin-dependent protein catabolic process; negative regulation of intrinsic apoptotic signaling pathway; regulation of protein ubiquitination; regulation of endoplasmic reticulum stress-induced intrinsic apoptotic signaling pathway; cellular calcium ion homeostasis; endoplasmic reticulum calcium ion homeostasis; response to endoplasmic reticulum stress; PERK-mediated unfolded protein response; positive regulation of ER-associated ubiquitin-dependent protein catabolic process; regulation of ER-associated ubiquitin-dependent protein catabolic process; response to unfolded protein; retrograde protein transport, ER to cytosol; positive regulation of protein binding; endoplasmic reticulum unfolded protein response; protein ubiquitination
Sources:Amigo / QuickGO
Orthologs
Species	Human	Mouse
Entrez	9709	64209
Ensembl	ENSG00000051108	ENSMUSG00000031770
UniProt	Q15011	Q9JJK5
RefSeq (mRNA)	NM_001010989; NM_001010990; NM_001272103; NM_014685	NM_022331; NM_001357205
RefSeq (protein)	NP_001010989; NP_001259032; NP_055500; NP_001259032.1	NP_071726; NP_001344134
Location (UCSC)	Chr 16: 56.93 – 56.94 Mb	Chr 8: 95.11 – 95.12 Mb
PubMed search
- Wikidata
View/Edit Human	View/Edit Mouse

Homocysteine-responsive endoplasmic reticulum-resident ubiquitin-like domain member 1 protein is a protein that in humans is encoded by the HERPUD1 gene.

The accumulation of unfolded proteins in the endoplasmic reticulum (ER) triggers the ER stress response. This response includes the inhibition of translation to prevent further accumulation of unfolded proteins, the increased expression of proteins involved in polypeptide folding, known as the unfolded protein response (UPR), and the destruction of misfolded proteins by the ER-associated protein degradation (ERAD) system. This gene may play a role in both UPR and ERAD. Its expression is induced by UPR and it has an ER stress response element in its promoter region while the encoded protein has an N-terminal ubiquitin-like domain which may interact with the ERAD system. This protein has been shown to interact with presenilin proteins and to increase the level of amyloid-beta protein following its overexpression. Alternative splicing of this gene produces multiple transcript variants, some encoding different isoforms. The full-length nature of all transcript variants has not been determined.

== Interactions ==
HERPUD1 has been shown to interact with UBQLN1 and UBQLN2.
