= Ubiquilin 4 =

Protein found in humans

UBQLN4

Identifiers
- Aliases: UBQLN4, A1U, A1Up, C1orf6, CIP75, UBIN, Ubiquilin 4
- External IDs: OMIM: 605440; MGI: 2150152; GeneCards: UBQLN4

Gene location (Human)
Chr.	Chromosome 1 (human)
Band	1q22	Start	156,035,299 bp
Band	1q22	End	156,053,798 bp

Gene location (Mouse)
Chr.	Chromosome 3 (mouse)
Band	3|3 F1	Start	88,461,065 bp
Band	3|3 F1	End	88,477,032 bp
RNA expression pattern
Bgee	Human / Mouse (ortholog); Top expressed in: ganglionic eminence; ventricular zone; gastrocnemius muscle; right frontal lobe; cingulate gyrus; anterior cingulate cortex; caudate nucleus; putamen; prefrontal cortex; tibialis anterior muscle / Top expressed in: ventricular zone; muscle of thigh; superior frontal gyrus; dentate gyrus of hippocampal formation granule cell; primary visual cortex; epiblast; skeletal muscle tissue; yolk sac; triceps brachii muscle; lip; More reference expression data
BioGPS	n/a
Gene ontology
Molecular function	polyubiquitin modification-dependent protein binding; protein binding; identical protein binding
Cellular component	cytoplasm; perinuclear region of cytoplasm; autophagosome; nuclear proteasome complex; cytosolic proteasome complex; cytosol; endoplasmic reticulum membrane; cytoplasmic vesicle; endoplasmic reticulum; nucleus; chromosome; site of DNA damage
Biological process	autophagy; negative regulation of autophagosome maturation; regulation of proteasomal ubiquitin-dependent protein catabolic process; ubiquitin-dependent protein catabolic process; DNA repair; cellular response to DNA damage stimulus; negative regulation of double-strand break repair via homologous recombination
Sources:Amigo / QuickGO
Orthologs
Databases	NCBI: entry; OMA: entry
Species	Human	Mouse
Entrez	56893	94232
Ensembl	ENSG00000160803	ENSMUSG00000008604
UniProt	Q9NRR5	Q99NB8
RefSeq (mRNA)	NM_001304342; NM_020131	NM_033526
RefSeq (protein)	NP_001291271; NP_064516	NP_277068
Location (UCSC)	Chr 1: 156.04 – 156.05 Mb	Chr 3: 88.46 – 88.48 Mb
PubMed search
- Wikidata
View/Edit Human	View/Edit Mouse

Ubiquilin 4 is a protein in humans that is encoded by the UBQLN4 gene. Ubiquilin 4 regulates proteasomal protein degradation.

== Similarity to Other Proteins ==
Human UBQLN4 shares a high degree of similarity with related ubiquilins including UBQLN1 and UBQLN2.
