= Derlin-2 =

Protein-coding gene in the species Homo sapiens

DERL2

Identifiers
- Aliases: DERL2, F-LAN-1, F-LANa, FLANa, CGI-101, DERtrin-2, derlin 2, derlin-2
- External IDs: OMIM: 610304; MGI: 2151483; GeneCards: DERL2

Gene location (Human)
Chr.	Chromosome 17 (human)
Band	17p13.2	Start	5,471,254 bp
Band	17p13.2	End	5,486,811 bp

Gene location (Mouse)
Chr.	Chromosome 11 (mouse)
Band	11 B4|11 43.21 cM	Start	70,897,990 bp
Band	11 B4|11 43.21 cM	End	70,910,667 bp
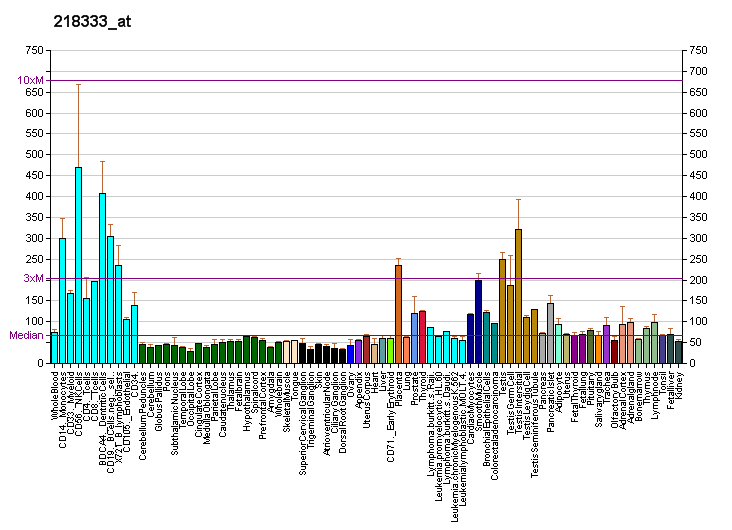
RNA expression pattern
Bgee	Human / Mouse (ortholog); Top expressed in: right testis; left testis; body of pancreas; Achilles tendon; right lobe of liver; parotid gland; mucosa of transverse colon; olfactory zone of nasal mucosa; right adrenal gland; granulocyte / Top expressed in: cumulus cell; left lobe of liver; seminal vesicula; lacrimal gland; decidua; right lung lobe; stroma of bone marrow; islet of Langerhans; right kidney; yolk sac; More reference expression data
BioGPS	More reference expression data
Gene ontology
Molecular function	protein binding; serine-type endopeptidase activity
Cellular component	integral component of membrane; integral component of endoplasmic reticulum membrane; late endosome; early endosome; endoplasmic reticulum membrane; endoplasmic reticulum; membrane; endoplasmic reticulum quality control compartment; signal recognition particle receptor complex; signal recognition particle
Biological process	endoplasmic reticulum unfolded protein response; positive regulation of cell growth; retrograde protein transport, ER to cytosol; response to unfolded protein; negative regulation of retrograde protein transport, ER to cytosol; positive regulation of cell population proliferation; ubiquitin-dependent ERAD pathway; suckling behavior; endoplasmic reticulum mannose trimming; proteolysis
Sources:Amigo / QuickGO
Orthologs
Databases	NCBI: entry; OMA: entry
Species	Human	Mouse
Entrez	51009	116891
Ensembl	ENSG00000072849	ENSMUSG00000018442
UniProt	Q9GZP9	Q8BNI4
RefSeq (mRNA)	NM_001304777; NM_001304779; NM_016041	NM_001291146; NM_001291147; NM_001291148; NM_033562
RefSeq (protein)	NP_001291706; NP_001291708; NP_057125	NP_001278075; NP_001278076; NP_001278077; NP_291040
Location (UCSC)	Chr 17: 5.47 – 5.49 Mb	Chr 11: 70.9 – 70.91 Mb
PubMed search
- Wikidata
View/Edit Human	View/Edit Mouse

Derlin-2 is a protein that in humans is encoded by the DERL2 gene.

== See also ==
- Derlin-1
- Derlin-3
