= Derlin-3 =

Protein-coding gene in the species Homo sapiens

DERL3

Identifiers
- Aliases: DERL3, C22orf14, IZP6, LLN2, derlin-3, derlin 3
- External IDs: OMIM: 610305; MGI: 1917627; GeneCards: DERL3

Gene location (Human)
Chr.	Chromosome 22 (human)
Band	22q11.23	Start	23,834,503 bp
Band	22q11.23	End	23,839,128 bp

Gene location (Mouse)
Chr.	Chromosome 10 (mouse)
Band	10|10 C1	Start	75,893,413 bp
Band	10|10 C1	End	75,895,941 bp
RNA expression pattern
Bgee	Human / Mouse (ortholog); Top expressed in: bone marrow cell; duodenum; tonsil; epithelium of colon; appendix; body of pancreas; lymph node; spleen; mucosa of transverse colon; rectum / Top expressed in: salivary gland; submandibular gland; lacrimal gland; parotid gland; zygote; seminal vesicula; primary oocyte; secondary oocyte; pyloric antrum; epithelium of stomach; More reference expression data
BioGPS	n/a
Gene ontology
Molecular function	protein binding
Cellular component	integral component of membrane; integral component of endoplasmic reticulum membrane; endoplasmic reticulum; endoplasmic reticulum membrane; membrane; signal recognition particle receptor complex; signal recognition particle
Biological process	endoplasmic reticulum unfolded protein response; negative regulation of retrograde protein transport, ER to cytosol; protein N-linked glycosylation via asparagine; ubiquitin-dependent ERAD pathway
Sources:Amigo / QuickGO
Orthologs
Databases	NCBI: entry; OMA: entry
Species	Human	Mouse
Entrez	91319	70377
Ensembl	ENSG00000274437; ENSG00000099958	ENSMUSG00000009092
UniProt	Q96Q80	Q9D8K3
RefSeq (mRNA)	NM_001002862; NM_001135751; NM_198440; NM_001363072	NM_024440
RefSeq (protein)	NP_001002862; NP_001129223; NP_940842; NP_001350001	NP_077760; NP_001345912; NP_001345913; NP_001345914
Location (UCSC)	Chr 22: 23.83 – 23.84 Mb	Chr 10: 75.89 – 75.9 Mb
PubMed search
- Wikidata
View/Edit Human	View/Edit Mouse

Derlin-3 is a protein that in humans is encoded by the DERL3 gene.

== See also ==
- Derlin-1
- Derlin-2
