= Vertebral Heart Score =

Metric in veterinary medicine

The Vertebral Heart Score (VHS) – also known as Vertebral Heart Size or Vertebral Heart Scale – is a measurement method used in veterinary medicine to assess the heart size of animals based on thoracic radiographs. It allows for the evaluation of heart size independent of the patient's overall body size, similar to the cardio-thoracic ratio in human medicine. The VHS is primarily used in dogs to detect cardiomegaly (heart enlargement), particularly in cases of heart diseases associated with dilation, such as dilated cardiomyopathy. The method involves projecting the long and short axes of the heart onto the thoracic vertebrae starting from the fourth thoracic vertebra and calculating the number of vertebrae these lengths cover. The VHS was established by Buchanan and Bücheler in 1995. A VHS of < 10.5 is generally considered normal for dogs, although higher values are accepted as physiological for certain breeds.

== Measurement and normal values ==
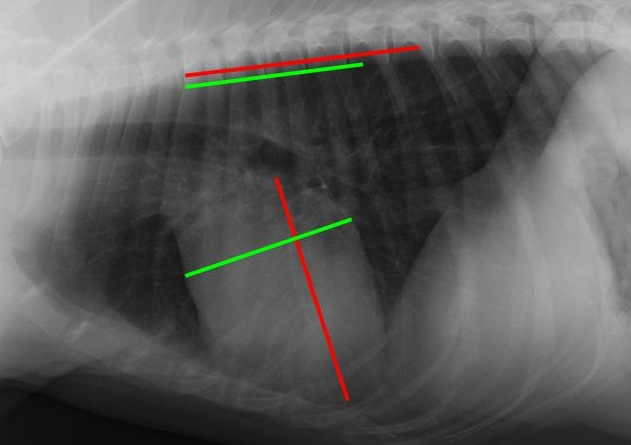
Determination of the VHS in a dog: The long axis (red) corresponds to 5.7 vertebral lengths, the short axis (green) to 4.3. The VHS is therefore 10, which lies within the normal range.

The VHS is typically determined using a thoracic radiograph taken in lateral recumbency. On the radiograph, the distance from the carina (bifurcation of the trachea) to the apex of the heart is measured (long axis), as well as a second distance perpendicular to the first at the widest part of the heart (short axis).

For dogs with significant enlargement of the left atrium, Buchanan suggests placing the dorsal end of the long axis at the elevated left bronchus. In older cats, where the long axis of the heart often runs nearly parallel to the sternum, the base of the vein of the cranial lung lobe is recommended as the reference point instead of the tracheal bifurcation. The measurement of the heart axes can also be performed on a radiograph taken in dorsal recumbency (ventrodorsal view); however, in dogs, the left atrium does not contribute to the cardiac silhouette in this projection.

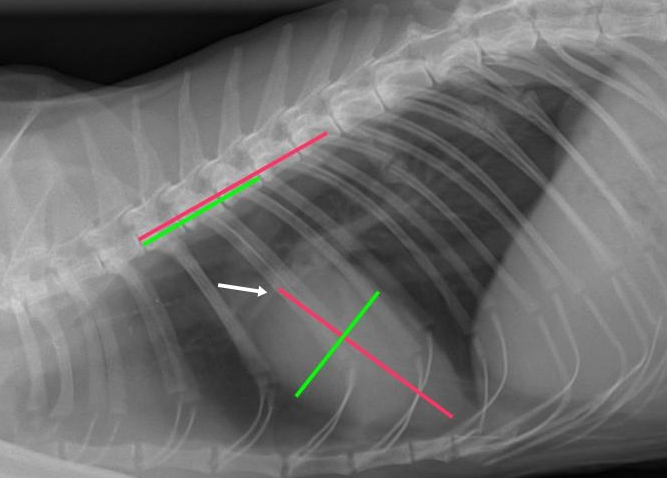
Determination of the VHS in a cat. The cranial pulmonary vein (white arrow) is used as the dorsal landmark for the long axis. Long axis (red) = 4.8, short axis (green) = 3 vertebrae. The VHS is 7.8, which is within the normal range.

These two lengths are then transferred to the thoracic vertebrae, beginning at the cranial edge of the fourth thoracic vertebra (T4). The number of vertebrae covered by these lengths is determined. If the end of the segment does not align perfectly with the end of a vertebra, the partial vertebra is estimated to the nearest tenth. For example, if the long axis extends from the beginning of T4 to the middle of T9, the value for this axis is 5.5. The length of a vertebral body combined with its associated intervertebral disc serves as a relative unit of measurement reflecting the size of the individual. Since vertebral lengths vary along the spine, it is crucial to always begin measuring from the specified vertebra (T4). The cardio-thoracic ratio, used in human medicine, is not suitable for dogs due to the significant variation in chest shape among different breeds.

The Vertebral Heart Score is the sum of the vertebral lengths covered by the long and short axes. A VHS of up to 10.5 (dog) or 8.1 (cat) is considered normal; higher values suggest cardiomegaly. The VHS is not used to diagnose a small heart (microcardia). Instead, microcardia is assessed by the number of intercostal spaces the cardiac silhouette covers. A small heart is typically caused by hypovolemia rather than heart disease. In such cases, the heart occupies fewer than two intercostal spaces.

=== Breed-specific ranges ===
Certain dog breeds typically present with higher VHS values. For the Boxer, a normal range of 10.8 to 12.4 applies; for French Bulldogs and English Bulldogs, the range is 11 to 14.4; and for the Boston Terrier, it is 10.3 to 13.1. Values up to 11.5 may be considered physiological for other breeds, including the Pomeranian, Cavalier King Charles Spaniel, Pug, Whippet, and Labrador Retriever.

== Other species ==
The relationship between heart size and thoracic vertebrae size has also been investigated in other animal species. Onuma et al. determined a mean VHS of 7.55 in domestic rabbits weighing less than 1.6 kg, and 8.0 in heavier animals. The same research group described heart axes in ferrets in relation to the length of the sixth thoracic vertebra (T6). In females, the long axis of the heart was 3.0 to 3.3 times the length of T6, and the short axis was 2.2 to 2.4 times the length. For males, the values were 3.2 to 3.7 times and 2.3 to 2.7 times the length of T6, respectively. A mean VHS of 9.36 was established for Alpaca crias, and 8.9 for the Ring-tailed lemur.

== Comparison to human medicine ==
In humans, the heart size is assessed using the cardio-thoracic ratio (CTR). This involves measuring the distance from the midline to the most lateral right and left heart borders on a standing PA (posterior-anterior) radiograph. The sum of these two distances is compared to the transverse diameter of the chest at the level of the right diaphragmatic dome. The ratio should not exceed 1:2 (0.5).

== Influencing factors and sources of error ==
Defining the measurement endpoints—and thus determining the length of the heart axes and the VHS—is subject to subjective assessment. In one study, the VHS varied by up to one vertebral length depending on the examiner. However, when measurements are performed by experienced veterinarians, the coefficient of variation is only 2.8%, and the recorded values correlate well with findings from other cardiac examination methods (Echocardiography, ECG).

Age has no influence on the VHS in dogs, whereas healthy young cats show a slightly higher VHS and only exhibit values typical for adult cats at the age of nine months. Sex and thoracic conformation do not influence the VHS. The radiograph should always be taken during maximal inspiration, as the heart size fluctuates more significantly between systole and diastole during the expiratory phase.

Accumulation of fluid or fat deposits in the pericardium can lead to an overestimation of heart size, since the radiographically visible cardiac silhouette actually represents the pericardial sac, which normally fits closely around the heart. Pericardial effusion (fluid accumulation in the pericardium) results in a VHS greater than 12.

In the hemivertebrae and wedge vertebrae found in the thoracic spine—primarily in Boston Terriers, Bulldogs, and Pugs—the vertebral body length is reduced. This is at least partially responsible for the higher VHS values observed in these breeds. Fused vertebrae (block vertebrae) also distort the VHS. The literature varies on whether the VHS is dependent on the side of recumbency. Some studies found the VHS to be slightly larger on radiographs taken in right lateral recumbency compared to left lateral recumbency, presumably because the distance of the heart to the X-ray film is slightly greater, leading to a slightly magnified image. Therefore, the same side should always be chosen for follow-up examinations.

== Diagnostic value ==
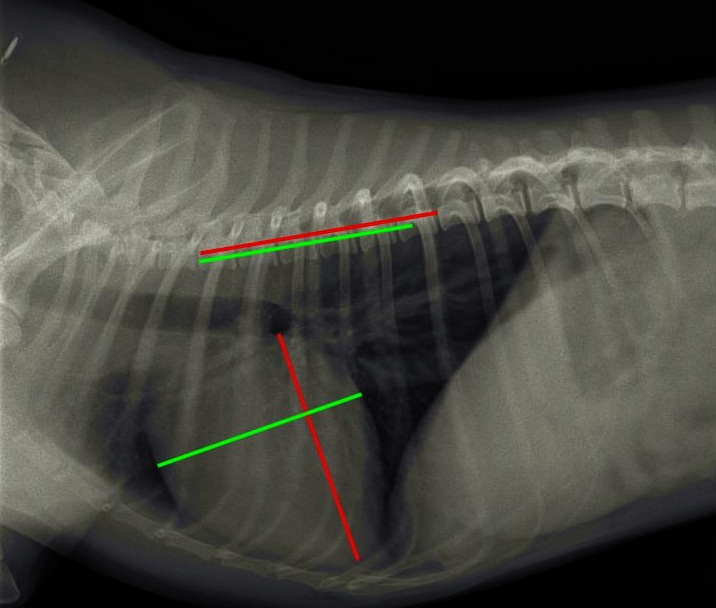
Cardiomegaly in a dog with dilated cardiomyopathy: The long axis measures 6, the short axis 5.4 thoracic vertebral lengths. The VHS is therefore 11.4, which is greater than the reference value of 10.5.

Heart size variability is relatively high, particularly in dogs. The specificity (true negative rate) of the method in dogs is reported as 76%, and the sensitivity (true positive rate) as 80%.

In cats, the specificity of the VHS is acceptable, but its sensitivity for detecting heart disease is low. This is primarily because cats predominantly develop diseases involving thickening of the heart wall (hypertrophic cardiomyopathy). The narrowing of the ventricular lumen caused by concentric thickening of the ventricular wall does not necessarily manifest as an enlargement of the external cardiac silhouette.

The reliability of the VHS increases with the severity of the heart disease in both dogs and cats. Advantages of radiographic cardiac examination are that X-ray equipment is available in many veterinary practices, and the radiograph can also reveal changes in the shape of the cardiac silhouette due to enlargement of specific heart chambers, as well as cardiac-related lung changes (pulmonary edema, congestion of pulmonary vessels).

Determining the VHS is therefore a useful contribution to cardiac diagnostics. However, for most heart diseases in dogs and cats, echocardiography is the more sensitive diagnostic technique, while for cardiac arrhythmias and early forms of dilated cardiomyopathy, ECG examination—particularly Holter ECG—is preferred. The combination of echocardiography and Holter ECG is considered the "gold standard" for dilated cardiomyopathies; consequently, it cannot be determined whether this combination might also yield false-positive or false-negative results.
