= VHS protein domain =

VHS
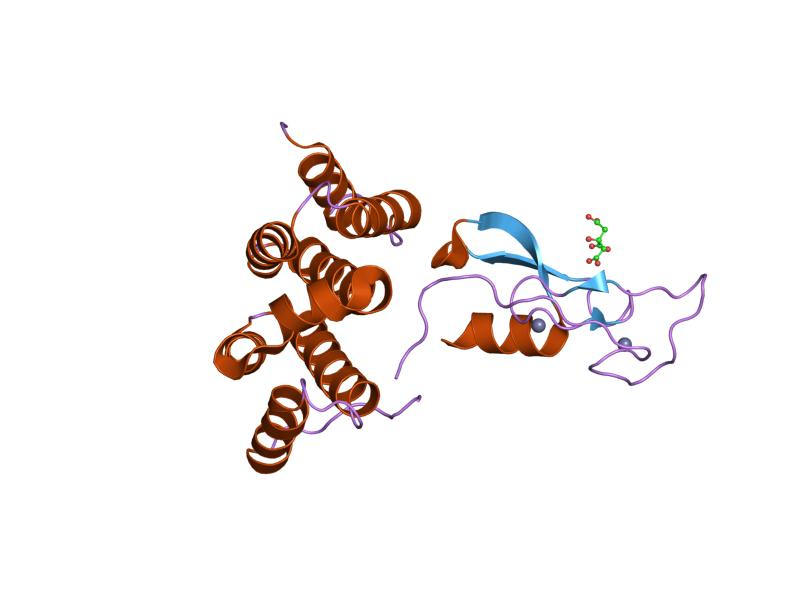
- crystal structure of the vhs and fyve tandem domains of hrs, a protein involved in membrane trafficking and signal transduction

Identifiers
- Symbol: VHS
- Pfam: PF00790
- Pfam clan: CL0009
- InterPro: IPR002014
- SMART: VHS
- SCOP2: 1elk / SCOPe / SUPFAM
Available protein structures:
- PDB: IPR002014 PF00790 (ECOD; PDBsum)
- AlphaFold: IPR002014; PF00790

In molecular biology, the VHS protein domain is approximately 140 residues long. Its name is an acronym derived from its occurrence in VPS-27, Hrs and STAM. It is a domain commonly found in the N-terminus of many proteins.

== Function ==
VHS domains are thought to be very important in vesicular trafficking, in particular, aiding membrane targeting and cargo recognition role.

== Structure ==
Resolution of the crystal structure of the VHS domain of Drosophila Hrs and human TOM1 revealed that it consists of eight helices arranged in a double-layer superhelix. The existence of conserved patches of residues on the domain surface suggests that VHS domains may be involved in protein-protein recognition and docking. Overall, sequence similarity is low (approx 25%) amongst domain family members.

== Classification ==
Based on regions surrounding the domain, VHS-proteins can be divided into 4 groups:

- STAM/EAST/STAM2(Hbp) which all share the domain composition VHS-SH3-ITAM and carry one or two ubiquitin-interacting motifs
- Proteins with a FYVE domain (INTERPRO) C-terminal to VHS which also carry one or two ubiquitin-interacting motifs
- GGA proteins with a domain composition VHS-GAT (GGA and Tom1) homology domain
- VHS domain alone or in combination with domains other than those listed above

The VHS domain is always found at the N-terminus of proteins suggesting that such topology is important for function. The domain is considered to have a general membrane targeting/cargo recognition role in vesicular trafficking.
