= Protein topology =

Invariant property of protein molecules

Topology of beta-strands in "Greek-key" protein motif.

Protein topology is a property of protein molecule that does not change under deformation (without cutting or breaking a bond).

== Frameworks ==
Two main topology frameworks have been developed and applied to protein molecules.

=== Knot Theory ===
Knot theory which categorises chain entanglements. The usage of knot theory is limited to a small percentage of proteins as most of them are unknot.

=== Circuit topology ===
Circuit topology categorises intra-chain contacts based on their arrangements. Circuit topology is a determinant of protein folding kinetics and stability.

== Other uses ==
In biology literature, the term topology is also used to refer to mutual orientation of regular secondary structures, such as alpha-helices and beta strands in protein structure . For example, two adjacent interacting alpha-helices or beta-strands can go in the same or in opposite directions. Topology diagrams of different proteins with known three-dimensional structure are provided by PDBsum (an example).

== See also ==
- Circuit topology
- Membrane topology
- Protein folding
