= UBQLN1 =

Protein-coding gene in the species Homo sapiens

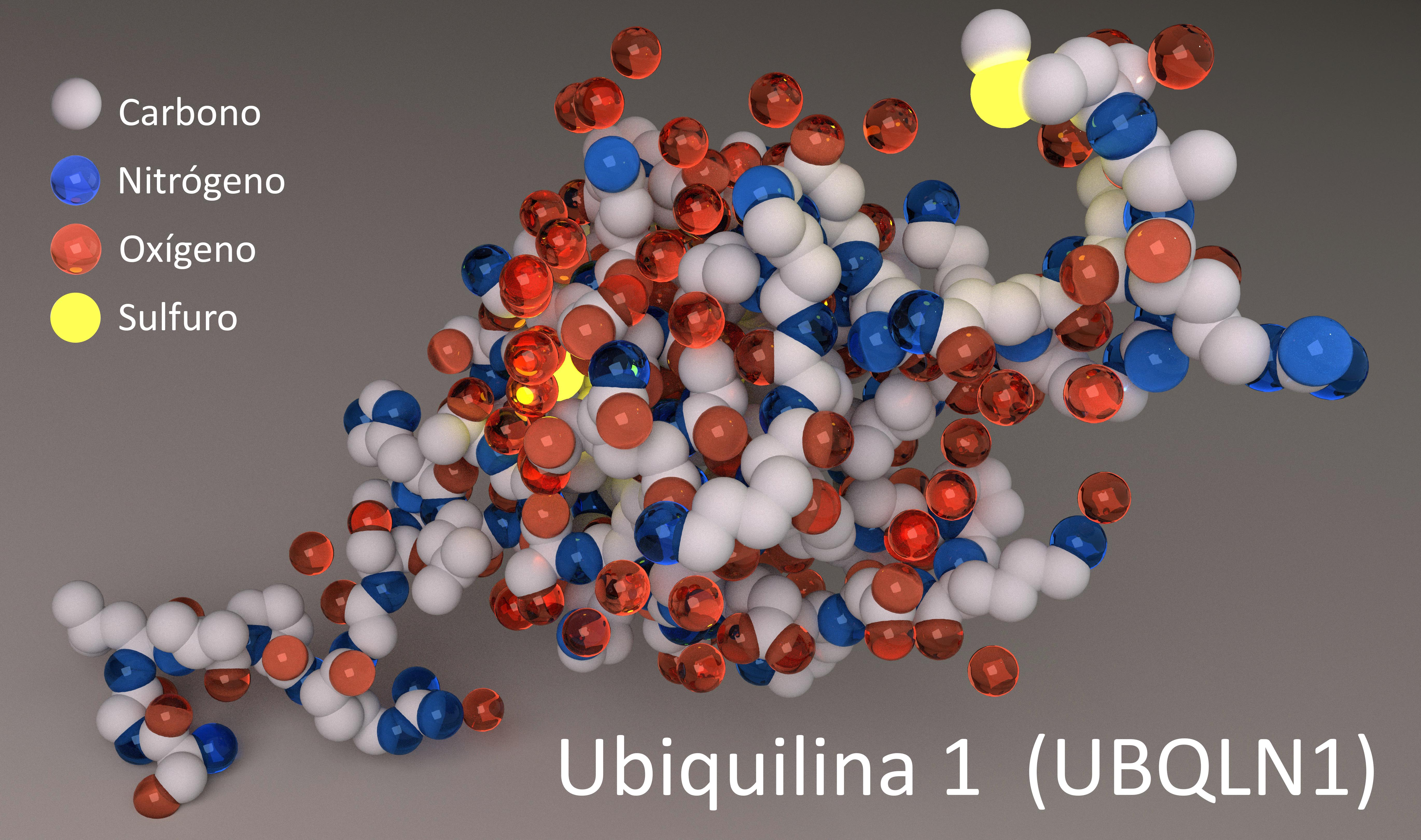
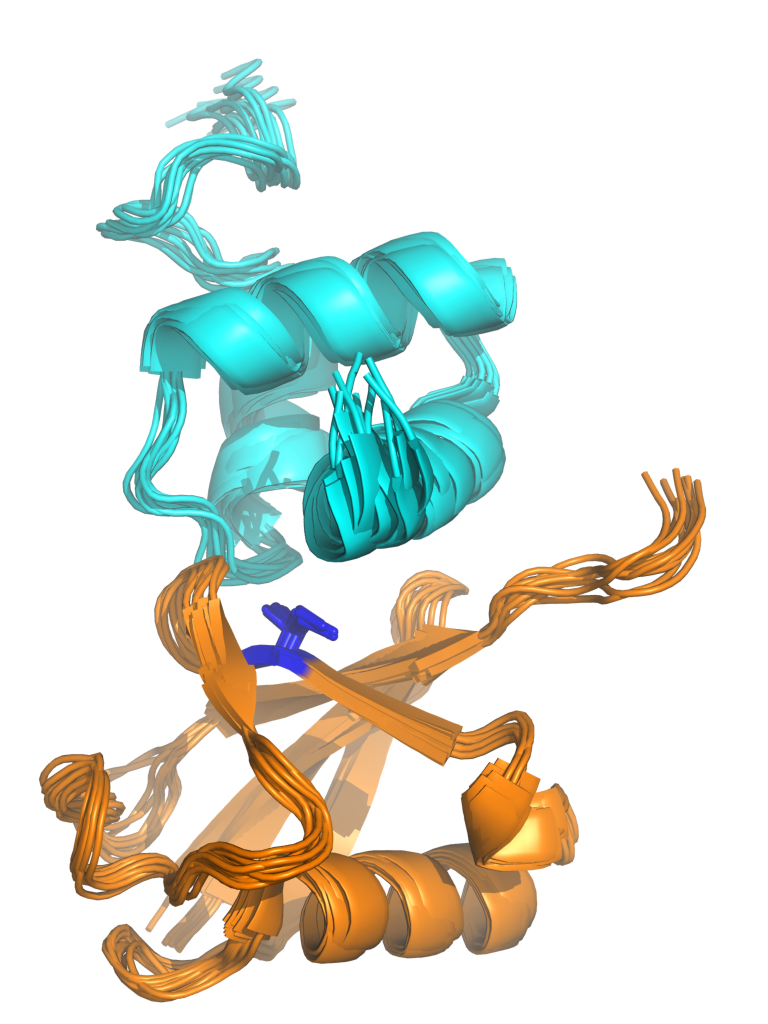
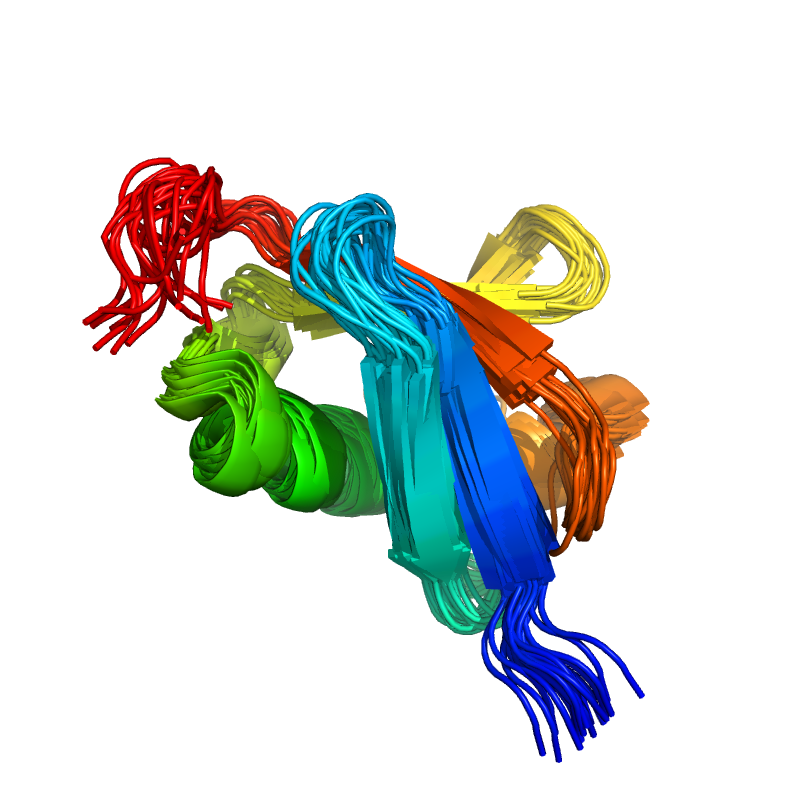

Identifiers
- Aliases: UBQLN1, DA41, DSK2, PLIC-1, UBQN, XDRP1, ubiquilin 1
- External IDs: OMIM: 605046; MGI: 1860276; GeneCards: UBQLN1
Available structures
PDB	Ortholog search: PDBe RCSB
PDB	List of PDB id codes 2JY5, 2JY6, 2KLC

Gene location (Human)
Chr.	Chromosome 9 (human)
Band	9q21.32|9q21.2-q21.3	Start	83,659,968 bp
Band	9q21.32|9q21.2-q21.3	End	83,707,958 bp

Gene location (Mouse)
Chr.	Chromosome 13 (mouse)
Band	13 B1|13 30.95 cM	Start	58,323,970 bp
Band	13 B1|13 30.95 cM	End	58,363,467 bp
RNA expression pattern
Bgee	Human / Mouse (ortholog); Top expressed in: mucosa of ileum; cardiac muscle tissue of right atrium; skin of arm; tibialis anterior muscle; myocardium of left ventricle; endothelial cell; pons; pancreatic epithelial cell; ganglionic eminence; stromal cell of endometrium / Top expressed in: secondary oocyte; seminal vesicula; parotid gland; medial dorsal nucleus; pontine nuclei; ventral tegmental area; dorsal tegmental nucleus; deep cerebellar nuclei; primitive streak; medial geniculate nucleus; More reference expression data
BioGPS	n/a
Gene ontology
Molecular function	polyubiquitin modification-dependent protein binding; kinase binding; protein binding; identical protein binding
Cellular component	cytoplasm; membrane; plasma membrane; nucleoplasm; aggresome; autophagosome; endoplasmic reticulum; perinuclear region of cytoplasm; proteasome complex; cytoplasmic vesicle; nucleus; cytosol; protein-containing complex
Biological process	aggrephagy; negative regulation of store-operated calcium channel activity; regulation of protein ubiquitination; regulation of oxidative stress-induced intrinsic apoptotic signaling pathway; response to endoplasmic reticulum stress; positive regulation of ER-associated ubiquitin-dependent protein catabolic process; autophagy; ubiquitin-dependent ERAD pathway; positive regulation of protein ubiquitination; negative regulation of toll-like receptor 3 signaling pathway; cellular response to hypoxia; autophagosome maturation; autophagosome assembly; macroautophagy; ubiquitin-dependent protein catabolic process; regulation of macroautophagy
Sources:Amigo / QuickGO
Orthologs
Databases	NCBI: entry; OMA: entry
Species	Human	Mouse
Entrez	29979	56085
Ensembl	ENSG00000135018	ENSMUSG00000005312
UniProt	Q9UMX0	Q8R317
RefSeq (mRNA)	NM_013438; NM_053067	NM_026842; NM_152234
RefSeq (protein)	NP_038466; NP_444295; NP_444295.1	NP_081118; NP_689420
Location (UCSC)	Chr 9: 83.66 – 83.71 Mb	Chr 13: 58.32 – 58.36 Mb
PubMed search
- Wikidata
View/Edit Human	View/Edit Mouse

Ubiquilin-1 is a protein that in humans is encoded by the UBQLN1 gene.

Ubiquilins contain two domains, an N-terminal ubiquitin-like domain and a C-terminal ubiquitin-associated domain. They physically associate with both proteasomes and ubiquitin ligases, and thus are thought to functionally link the ubiquitination machinery to the proteasome to effect in vivo protein degradation.

== Functions ==
Ubiquilin-1 is associated with protein degradation and aggregation of misfolded proteins, and may be involved in neurodegenerative diseases. Ubiquilin-1 has been reported to act as a molecular chaperone for amyloid precursor protein (APP), a protein associated with Alzheimer's disease.

Ubiquilin-1 was first identified through its interactions with presenilins. Two transcript variants encoding different isoforms have been found for this gene.

== Related proteins ==
Human UBQLN1 shares a high degree of similarity with related ubiquilins including UBQLN2 and UBQLN4.

== Interactions ==
UBQLN1 has been shown to interact with

- HERPUD1,
- MTOR,
- P4HB,
- PSEN1
- PSEN2, and
- UBE3A.
- TMCO6,
