= UBA protein domain =

UBA
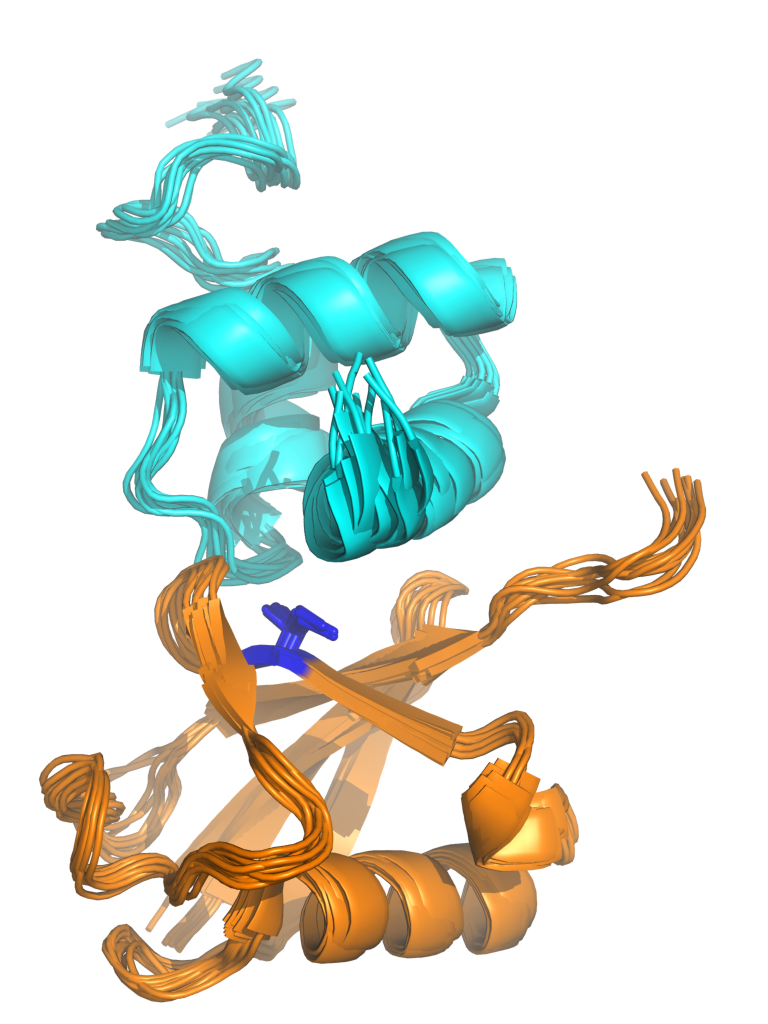
- The NMR structure of a UBA domain from the protein ubiquilin-1 (top, cyan) bound to ubiquitin (bottom, orange), illustrating the three-helix bundle structure of the UBA domain. Isoleucine 44, the center of a hydrophobic patch on the ubiquitin surface that interacts with a number of ubiquitin-binding domains, is highlighted in blue. Rendered from PDB: 2JY6.

Identifiers
- Symbol: UBA
- Pfam: PF00627
- Pfam clan: CL0214
- ECOD: 103.1.1
- InterPro: IPR015940
- PROSITE: PDOC50030
- SCOP2: 1efu / SCOPe / SUPFAM
- CDD: cd00194
Available protein structures:
- PDB: IPR015940 PF00627 (ECOD; PDBsum)
- AlphaFold: IPR015940; PF00627

Ubiquitin-associated (UBA) domains are protein domains that non-covalently interact with ubiquitin through protein-protein interactions. Ubiquitin is a small protein that is covalently linked to other proteins as part of intracellular signaling pathways, often as a signal for protein degradation. UBA domains are among the most common ubiquitin-binding domains.

== Function ==
Proteins containing UBA domains are involved in a variety of additional cell processes, such as nucleotide excision repair (NER), spindle pole body duplication, and cell growth.

Protein degradation via the ubiquitin proteasome system (UPS) allows the cell to selectively negatively regulate intracellular proteins. Protein degradation helps to maintain protein quality control, signalling, and cell cycle progression. UBA has been proposed to limit ubiquitin chain elongation and to target polyubiquitinated proteins to the 26S proteasome for degradation. They have been identified in modular proteins involved in protein trafficking, DNA repair, proteasomal degradation, and cell cycle regulation.

== Structure ==
UBA domains have a common sequence motif of approximately 45 amino acid residues. They fold into three-helix bundle structures.

== Examples ==
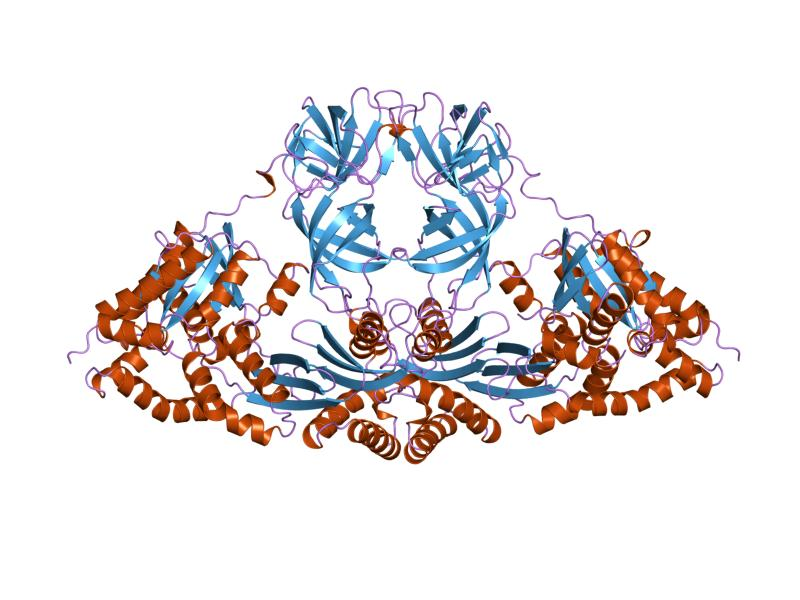
The structure of the prokaryotic elongation factor EF-Ts bound to EF-Tu. Rendered from PDB: 1EFU.

The human homologue of yeast Rad23A is one example of a nucleotide excision-repair protein that contains both an internal and a C-terminal UBA domain. The solution structure of human Rad23A UBA(2) showed that the domain forms a compact three-helix bundle.

Comparison of the structures of UBA(1) and UBA(2) reveals that both form very similar folds and have a conserved large hydrophobic surface patch which may be a common protein-interacting surface present in diverse UBA domains. Evidence that ubiquitin binds to UBA domains leads to the prediction that the hydrophobic surface patch of UBA domains interacts with the hydrophobic surface on the five-stranded beta-sheet of ubiquitin.

This domain is similar in sequence to the N-terminal domain of translation elongation factor EF1B (or EF-Ts) from bacteria, mitochondria and chloroplasts.
