= SYVN1 =

Protein-coding gene in the species Homo sapiens

Identifiers
- Aliases: SYVN1, DER3, HRD1, synoviolin 1
- External IDs: OMIM: 608046; MGI: 1921376; GeneCards: SYVN1
Enzyme activity
| EC # | BRENDA | ExPASy | KEGG | MetaCyc |
|---|---|---|---|---|
| 2.3.2.27 | ↗ | ↗ | ↗ | ↗ |

Gene location (Human)
| Chr. | Chromosome 11 (human) |
| Band | 11q13.1 | Start | 65,121,780 bp |
| Band | 11q13.1 | End | 65,134,532 bp |

Gene location (Mouse)
| Chr. | Chromosome 19 (mouse) |
| Band | 19|19 A | Start | 6,096,606 bp |
| Band | 19|19 A | End | 6,103,742 bp |
RNA expression pattern
| Bgee | Human / Mouse (ortholog); Top expressed in: mucosa of ileum; body of pancreas; right lobe of liver; bone marrow cell; appendix; stromal cell of endometrium; islet of Langerhans; right lobe of thyroid gland; lymph node; left lobe of thyroid gland / Top expressed in: mesenteric lymph nodes; lacrimal gland; salivary gland; decidua; left lobe of liver; islet of Langerhans; molar; spleen; seminal vesicula; renal corpuscle; More reference expression data |
| BioGPS | n/a |
Gene ontology
| Molecular function | chaperone binding; unfolded protein binding; ATPase binding; metal ion binding; protein binding; ubiquitin-specific protease binding; ubiquitin protein ligase activity; transferase activity |
| Cellular component | integral component of membrane; endoplasmic reticulum membrane; nucleoplasm; smooth endoplasmic reticulum; integral component of endoplasmic reticulum membrane; endoplasmic reticulum quality control compartment; Derlin-1 retrotranslocation complex; Hrd1p ubiquitin ligase complex; Hrd1p ubiquitin ligase ERAD-L complex; membrane; endoplasmic reticulum |
| Biological process | protein stabilization; protein K48-linked ubiquitination; retrograde protein transport, ER to cytosol; IRE1-mediated unfolded protein response; negative regulation of endoplasmic reticulum stress-induced intrinsic apoptotic signaling pathway; protein N-linked glycosylation via asparagine; endoplasmic reticulum mannose trimming; ERAD pathway; endoplasmic reticulum unfolded protein response; ubiquitin-dependent ERAD pathway; protein ubiquitination; ubiquitin-dependent protein catabolic process |
Sources:Amigo / QuickGO
Orthologs
| Databases | NCBI: entry; OMA: entry |
| Species | Human | Mouse |
| Entrez | 84447 | 74126 |
| Ensembl | ENSG00000162298 | ENSMUSG00000024807 |
| UniProt | Q86TM6 | Q9DBY1 |
| RefSeq (mRNA) | NM_032431; NM_172230 | NM_001164709; NM_028769 |
| RefSeq (protein) | NP_115807; NP_757385 | NP_001158181; NP_083045 |
| Location (UCSC) | Chr 11: 65.12 – 65.13 Mb | Chr 19: 6.1 – 6.1 Mb |
| PubMed search |
- Wikidata
| View/Edit Human | View/Edit Mouse |

E3 ubiquitin-protein ligase synoviolin is an enzyme that in humans is encoded by the SYVN1 gene.

== Function ==
This gene encodes a protein involved in endoplasmic reticulum (ER)-associated degradation. The encoded protein removes unfolded proteins, accumulated during ER stress, by retrograde transport to the cytosol from the ER. This protein also uses the ubiquitin-proteasome system for additional degradation of unfolded proteins. This gene and the mitochondrial ribosomal protein L49 gene use in their respective 3' UTRs some of the same genomic sequence. Sequence analysis identified two transcript variants that encode different isoforms.
