= Ubiquitin-interacting motif =

UIM
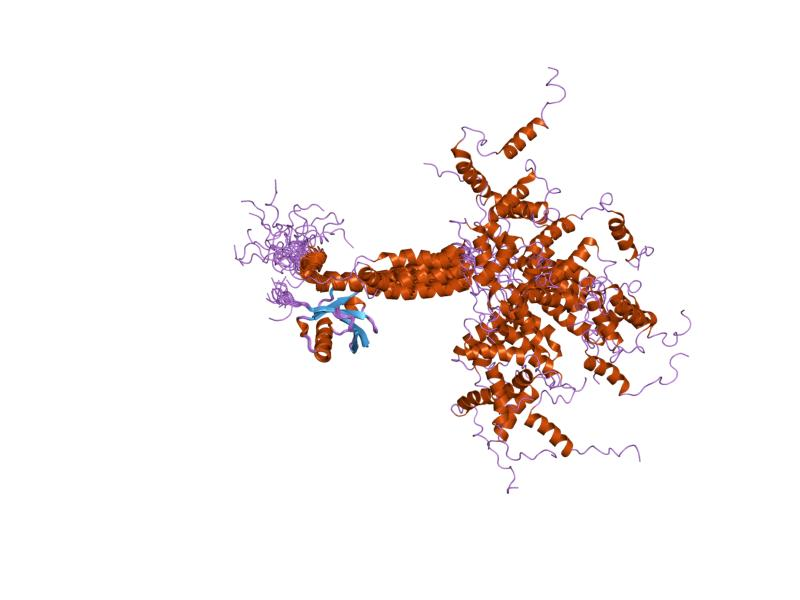
- solution structure of s5a uim-1/ubiquitin complex

Identifiers
- Symbol: UIM
- Pfam: PF02809
- InterPro: IPR003903
- SCOP2: 1p9d / SCOPe / SUPFAM
Available protein structures:
- Pfam: structures / ECOD
- PDB: RCSB PDB; PDBe; PDBj
- PDBsum: structure summary

In molecular biology, the Ubiquitin-Interacting Motif (UIM), or 'LALAL-motif', is a sequence motif of about 20 amino acid residues, which was first described in the 26S proteasome subunit PSD4/RPN-10 that is known to recognise ubiquitin. In addition, the UIM is found, often in tandem or triplet arrays, in a variety of proteins either involved in ubiquitination and ubiquitin metabolism, or known to interact with ubiquitin-like modifiers. Among the UIM proteins are two different subgroups of the UBP (ubiquitin carboxy-terminal hydrolase) family of deubiquitinating enzymes, one F-box protein, one family of HECT-containing ubiquitin-ligases (E3s) from plants, and several proteins containing ubiquitin-associated UBA and/or UBX domains. In most of these proteins, the UIM occurs in multiple copies and in association with other domains such as UBA (INTERPRO), UBX (INTERPRO), ENTH domain, EH (INTERPRO), VHS (INTERPRO), SH3 domain, HECT, VWFA (INTERPRO), EF-hand calcium-binding, WD-40, F-box (INTERPRO), LIM, protein kinase, ankyrin, PX, phosphatidylinositol 3- and 4-kinase (INTERPRO), C2 domain, OTU (INTERPRO), DnaJ domain (INTERPRO), RING-finger (INTERPRO) or FYVE-finger (INTERPRO). UIMs have been shown to bind ubiquitin and to serve as a specific targeting signal important for monoubiquitination. Thus, UIMs may have several functions in ubiquitin metabolism each of which may require different numbers of UIMs.

The UIM is unlikely to form an independent protein domain. Instead, based on the spacing of the conserved residues, the motif probably forms a short alpha-helix that can be embedded into different protein folds. Some proteins known to contain an UIM are listed below:

- Eukaryotic PSD4/RPN-10/S5, a multi-ubiquitin binding subunit of the 26S proteasome.
- Vertebrate Machado-Joseph disease protein 1 (Ataxin-3), which acts as a histone-binding protein that regulates transcription; defects in Ataxin-3 cause the neurodegenerative disorder Machado-Joseph disease (MJD).
- Vertebrate epsin and epsin2.
- Vertebrate hepatocyte growth factor-regulated tyrosine kinase substrate (HRS).
- Mammalian epidermal growth factor receptor substrate 15 (EPS15), which is involved in cell growth regulation.
- Mammalian epidermal growth factor receptor substrate EPS15R.
- Drosophila melanogaster (Fruit fly) liquid facets (lqf), an epsin.
- Yeast VPS27 vacuolar sorting protein, which is required for membrane traffic to the vacuole.
