= Genetics of Down syndrome =

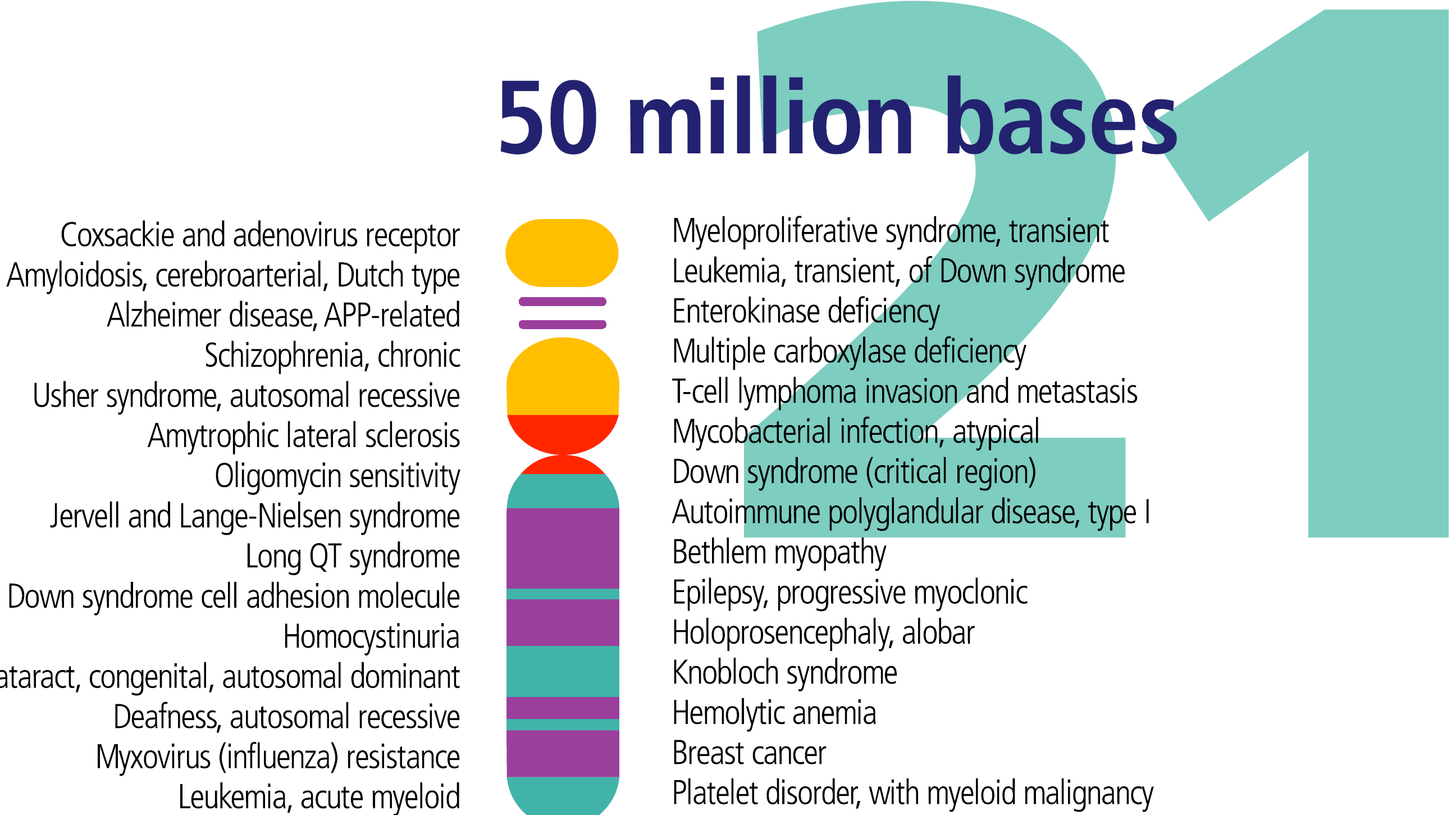
Chromosome 21 from Human Genome Program

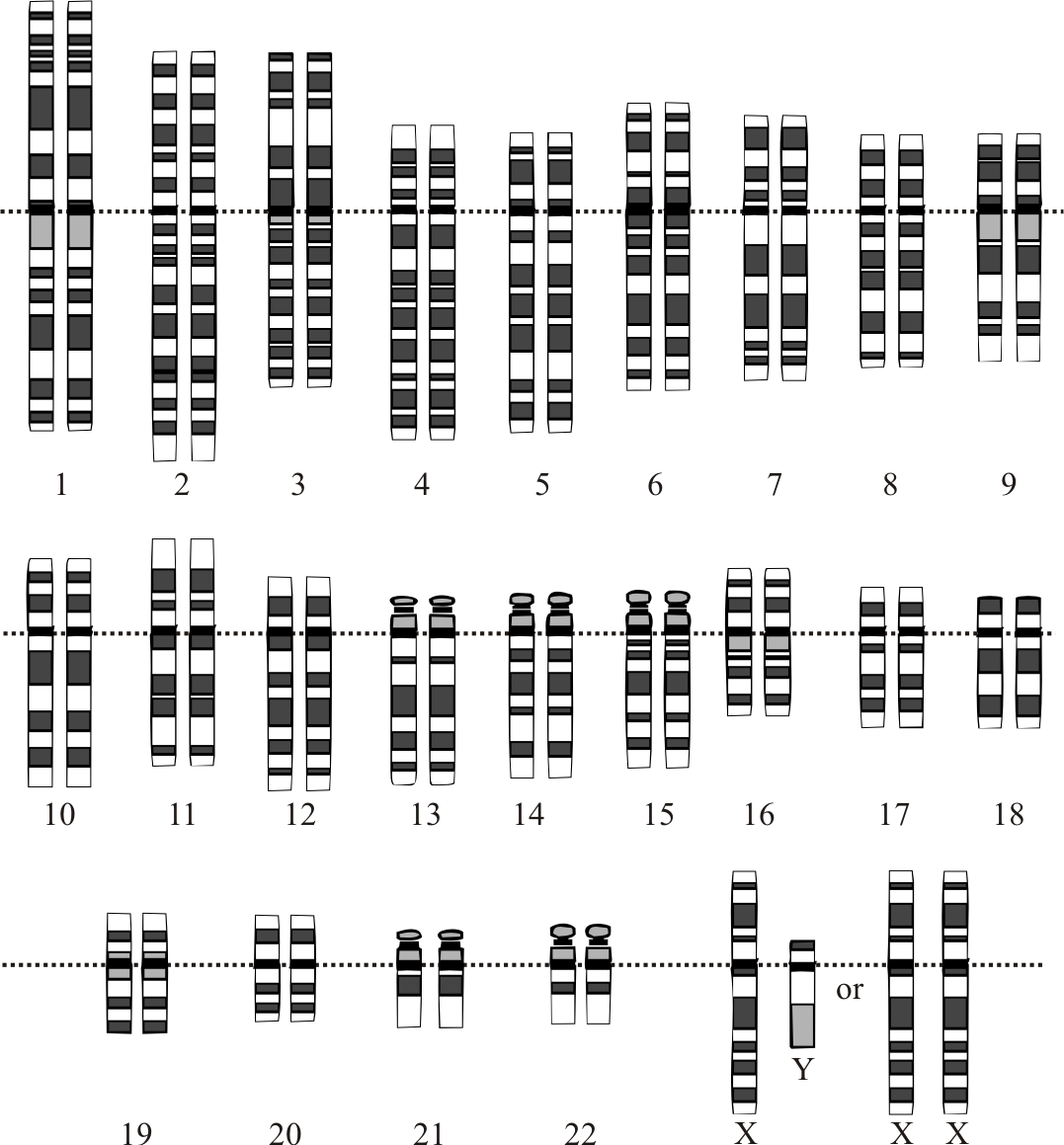
Normal human Karyotype

Down syndrome is a chromosomal abnormality characterized by the presence of an extra copy of genetic material on chromosome 21, either in whole (trisomy 21) or part (such as due to translocations). The effects of the extra copy varies greatly from individual to individual, depending on the extent of the extra copy, genetic background, environmental factors, and random chance. Down syndrome can occur in all human populations, and analogous effects have been found in other species, such as chimpanzees and mice. In 2005, researchers have been able to create transgenic mice with most of human chromosome 21 (in addition to their normal chromosomes).

A typical human karyotype is shown here. Every chromosome has two copies. In the bottom right, there are chromosomal differences between males (XY) and females (XX), which do not concern us. A typical human karyotype is designated as 46,XX or 46,XY, indicating 46 chromosomes with an XX arrangement for females and 46 chromosomes with an XY arrangement for males. For this article, we will use females for the karyotype designation (46,XX).

== Trisomy 21 ==
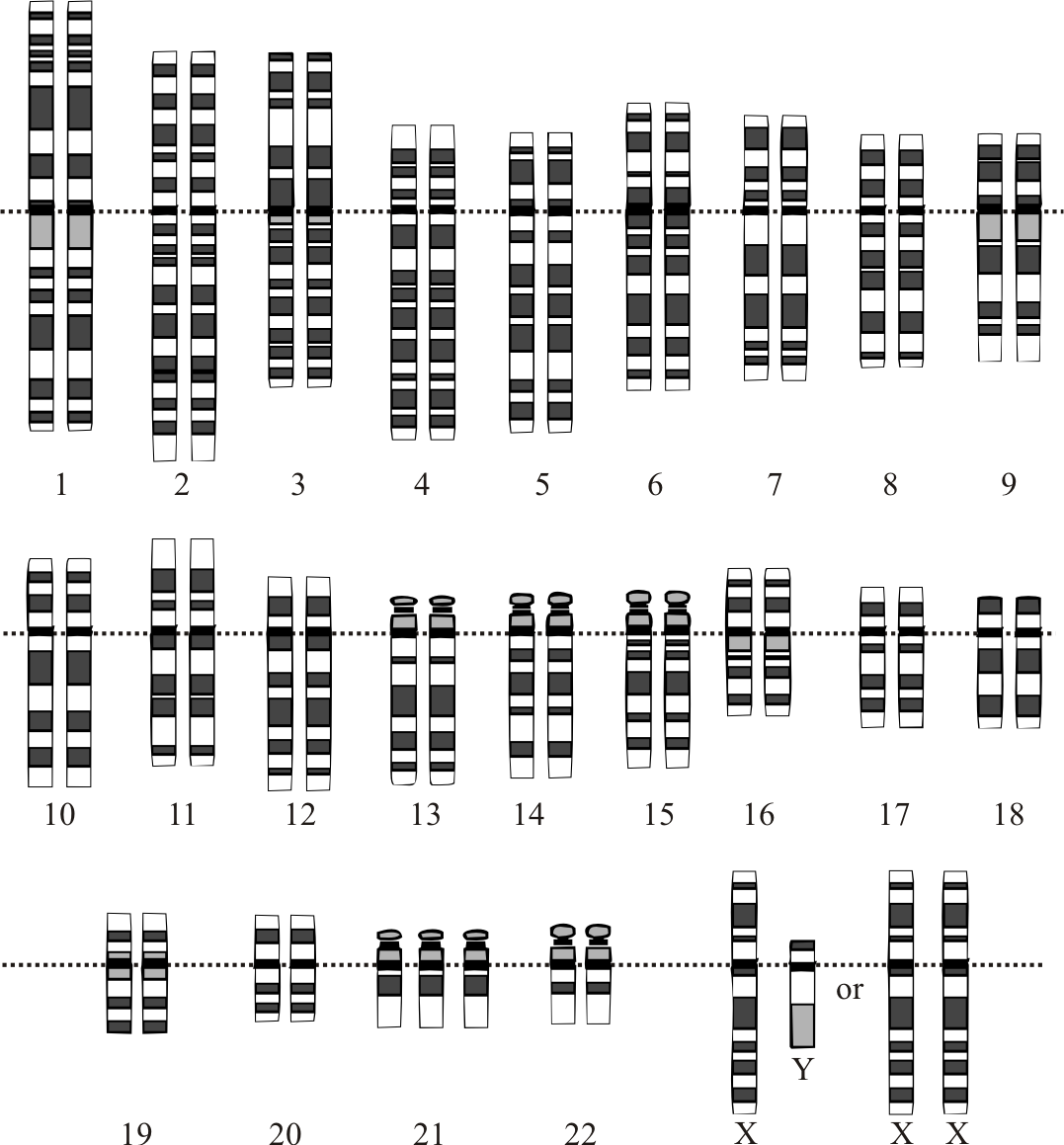
Karyotype for trisomy Down syndrome. Notice the three copies of chromosome 21.

Trisomy 21 (47,XY,+21) is caused by a meiotic nondisjunction event. A typical gamete (either egg or sperm) has one copy of each chromosome (23 total). When it is combined with a gamete from the other parent during conception, the child has 46 chromosomes. However, with nondisjunction, a gamete is produced with an extra copy of chromosome 21 (the gamete has 24 chromosomes). When combined with a typical gamete from the other parent, the child now has 47 chromosomes, with three copies of chromosome 21. The trisomy 21 karyotype figure shows the chromosomal arrangement, with the prominent extra chromosome 21.

Trisomy 21 is the cause of approximately 95% of observed Down syndrome, with 88% coming from nondisjunction in the maternal gamete and 8% coming from nondisjunction in the paternal gamete. Mitotic nondisjunction after conception would lead to mosaicism, and is discussed later.

Some cases have been reported of people with Down syndrome having children with trisomy 21. In these cases (all from mothers), the ovaries were trisomy 21, leading to a secondary nondisjunction during gametogenesis and a gamete with an extra chromosome 21. Such Down syndrome trisomies are indistinguishable from Down syndrome trisomy created through meiotic nondisjunction.

== Translocation ==
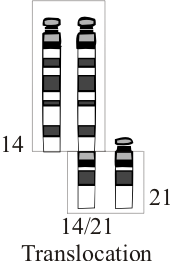
Balanced translocation with chromosomes 14 and 21q

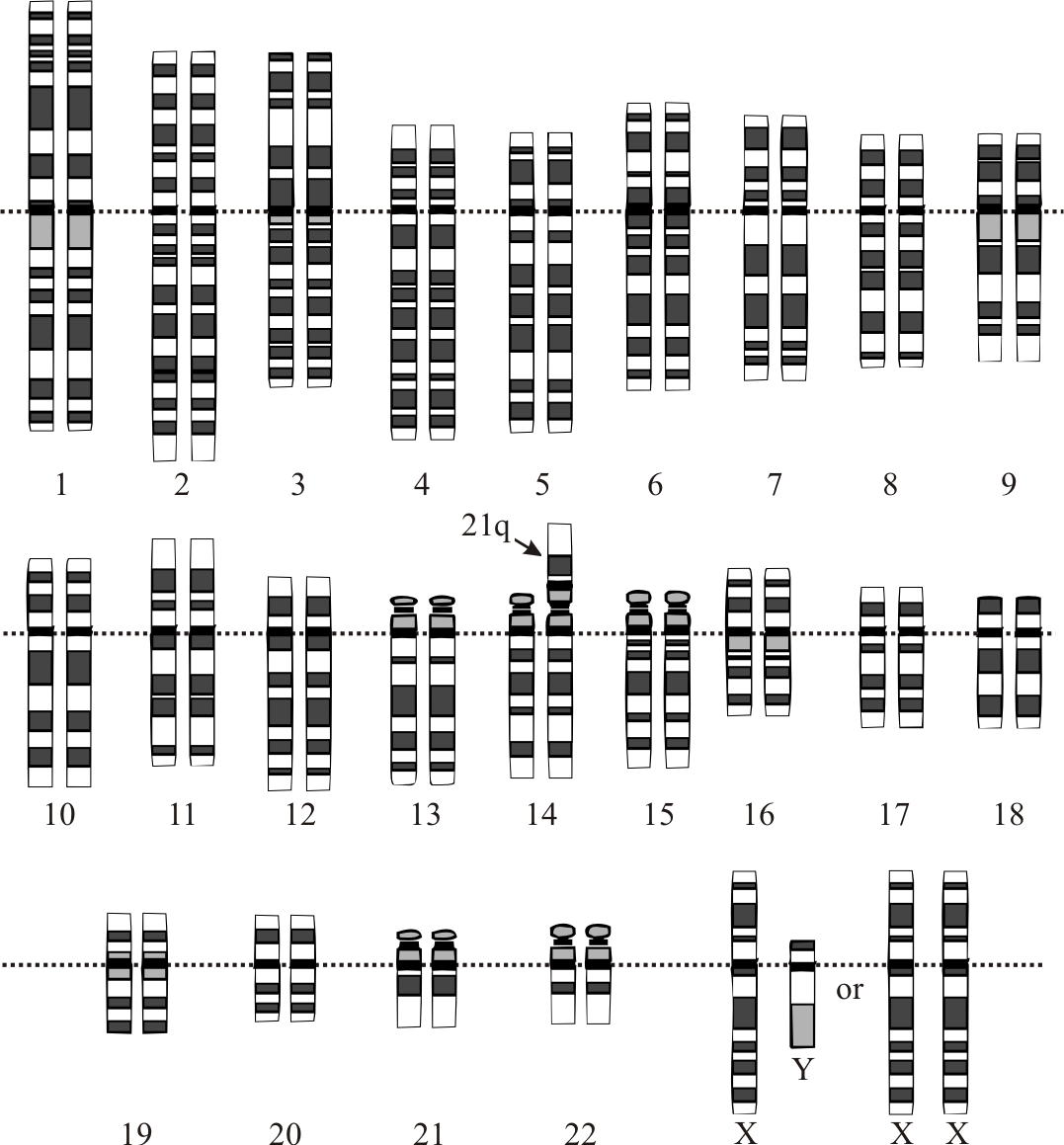
Translocation karyotype for Down syndrome with 14/21 Robertsonian translocation. Notice the three copies of 21q (two chromosomes 21 and the long arm of chromosome 21 fused to the short arm of a chromosome 14).

The extra chromosome 21 material that causes Down syndrome may be due to a Robertsonian translocation. The long arm of chromosome 21 is attached to the long arm of another chromosome, often chromosome 14 [46,XX,t(14;21)] or itself [called an isochromosome, 45,XX,t(21;21)(q10;q10)] as seen in the translocation karyotype figure.

Translocation Down syndrome can be de novo; that is, not inherited but occurring at the time of an individual's conception, or may be inherited from a parent with a balanced translocation. The balanced translocation figure shows a 14/21 translocation between the long arms of chromosomes 14 and 21, where the other chromosomes are not shown. The individual has two copies of everything on chromosome 14, and two copies of all of the material on the long arm of chromosome 21 (21q). The derivative chromosome 21, which contains only heterochromatin, is lost; thus, the individual only has one copy of the material on the short arm of chromosome 21 (21p), but this appears to have no discernible effect. Individuals with this chromosomal arrangement have 45 chromosomes and are phenotypically normal. During meiosis, the chromosomal arrangement interferes with normal separation of chromosomes. Possible gametic arrangements are (see translocation karyotype figure):

Offspring from one parent with a balanced translocation and the other parent who has normal chromosomes

1. translocated 14/21 and normal 14;
2. normal 14 and normal 21;
3. translocated 14/21 and normal 21;
4. normal 21 only;
5. normal 14 only;
6. translocated 14/21 only.

When combined with a normal gamete from the other parent, the first, fourth and fifth are lethal, leading to spontaneous abortion. The second, combined with a normal gamete from the other parent, gives rise to a typical child. The third leads to a child with translocation Down syndrome. The last becomes a translocation carrier, like the parent.

Translocation Down syndrome is often referred to as familial Down syndrome. It is the cause of about 4.5% of the observed Down syndromes. It does not show the maternal age effect, and is just as likely to have come from fathers as mothers.

== Mosaicism ==
Mosaic Down syndrome is when some of the cells in the body do not have trisomy 21 and some cells have trisomy 21, an arrangement called a mosaic (46,XX/47,XX,+21). This can occur in one of two ways:

- A nondisjunction event during an early cell division leads to a fraction of the cells with trisomy 21;
- An anaphase lag of a chromosome 21 in a Down syndrome embryo leads to a fraction of euploid cells (2n cells), phenomenon described as "aneuploidy rescue".

There is considerable variability in the fraction of cells with trisomy 21, both as a whole and tissue-by-tissue. This is the cause of 1–2% of the observed Down syndromes. There is evidence that mosaic Down syndrome may produce less developmental delay, on average, than full trisomy 21.

The following diagram shows two possible mechanisms leading to mosaic trisomy 21.

           2n          
         /    \        
      2n+1    2n-1

Schematic of nondisjunction in mitosis.

Chromosomes in diploid somatic cell (2n). The nondisjunction leads to a daughter cell with a supernumerary chromosome (2n+1) and another cell missing a chromosome (2n-1).

          2n+1          
         /    \-> 1
        /      \      
      2n+1      2n

Schematic of anaphase lag in mitosis.

Chromosomes in trisomy somatic cell (2n+1). One of the daughter cell is trisomic. The other daughter undergo anaphase lag: the supernumerary chromosome has a delayed movement during anaphase and fails to be included in the nucleusis. This mitotic segregation error restores the normal chromosome complement (2n).

== Duplication of a portion of chromosome 21 ==
Rarely, a region of chromosome 21 will undergo a duplication event. This will lead to extra copies of some, but not all, of the genes on chromosome 21 (46,XX,dup(21q)). If the duplicated region has genes that are responsible for Down syndrome physical and mental characteristics, such individuals will show those characteristics. This cause is very rare and no rate estimates are possible.

== See also ==
- Aneuploidy
- Mouse models of Down syndrome
- Down syndrome research
