= Trisomic rescue =

Trisomic rescue (also known as trisomy rescue or trisomy zygote rescue) is a genetic phenomenon in which a fertilized ovum containing three copies of a chromosome loses one of these chromosomes (anaphase lag) to form a diploid chromosome complement. If both of the retained chromosomes come from the same parent, then uniparental disomy results. If the retained chromosomes come from different parents (that is, one copy from each) then there are no phenotypic or genotypic anomalies. The mechanism of trisomic rescue has been well confirmed in vivo, and alternative mechanisms that occur in trisomies are rare in comparison.

Many trisomic conditions result in stillborn infants (major exceptions include trisomies 13, 18, 21). Trisomic rescue may be a natural means to keep a fetus as viable as possible (though uniparental disomy may occur and result in syndromes such as Prader-Willi and Angelman syndromes due to genetic imprinting). Indeed, spontaneous trisomic rescue has been observed in vitro. Similarly, monosomic rescue may also be a natural means to keep fetal viability via restoration of a disomic zygote.
