= SNRPN upstream reading frame protein =

Protein-coding gene in the species Homo sapiens

SNURF

Identifiers
- Aliases: SNURF, SNRPN upstream reading frame, SNRPN upstream open reading frame
- External IDs: MGI: 1891236; HomoloGene: 36493; GeneCards: SNURF; OMA:SNURF - orthologs

Gene location (Human)
Chr.	Chromosome 15 (human)
Band	15q11.2	Start	24,954,986 bp
Band	15q11.2	End	24,977,850 bp

Gene location (Mouse)
Chr.	Chromosome 7 (mouse)
Band	7|7 B5	Start	59,645,197 bp
Band	7|7 B5	End	59,654,797 bp
RNA expression pattern
Bgee	Human / Mouse (ortholog); Top expressed in: ganglionic eminence; stromal cell of endometrium; islet of Langerhans; skeletal muscle tissue; superior frontal gyrus; right auricle of heart; left ventricle; corpus callosum; Descending thoracic aorta; gonad / Top expressed in: hypothalamus; striatum of neuraxis; dentate gyrus of hippocampal formation granule cell; primary visual cortex; layer of retina; neural layer of retina; cerebellum; cerebellar cortex; Cortex of frontal lobe; epiblast; More reference expression data
BioGPS	n/a
Gene ontology
Molecular function	molecular function; protein binding; RNA binding
Cellular component	nucleus; nuclear speck; cytoplasm; U5 snRNP; catalytic step 2 spliceosome; U4/U6 x U5 tri-snRNP complex; spliceosomal complex; U4 snRNP; small nuclear ribonucleoprotein complex; U2-type prespliceosome; nucleoplasm; U1 snRNP; U2 snRNP
Biological process	biological process; RNA splicing; mRNA splicing, via spliceosome; response to hormone
Sources:Amigo / QuickGO
Orthologs
Species	Human	Mouse
Entrez	8926	84704
Ensembl	ENSG00000273173	ENSMUSG00000102627
UniProt	Q9Y675; P63162	Q9WU12
RefSeq (mRNA)	NM_005678; NM_022804; NM_001394334	NM_033174
RefSeq (protein)	NP_005669; NP_073715; NP_003088; NP_073716; NP_073717 NP_073718; NP_073719; NP_001336383; NP_001336384; NP_001336385; NP_001336386; NP_001336387; NP_001336388; NP_001336389; NP_001336390; NP_001336391; NP_001336392; NP_001336393; NP_001336394; NP_001365178; NP_001365180; NP_001365181; NP_001365182; NP_001365183; NP_001365184; NP_001365185; NP_001365186	NP_149409
Location (UCSC)	Chr 15: 24.95 – 24.98 Mb	Chr 7: 59.65 – 59.65 Mb
PubMed search
- Wikidata
View/Edit Human	View/Edit Mouse

SNRPN upstream reading frame protein is a protein that in humans is encoded by the SNURF gene.

== Function ==
This gene encodes a highly basic protein localized to the nucleus. The evolutionarily constrained open reading frame is found on a bicistronic transcript which has a downstream ORF encoding the small nuclear ribonucleoprotein polypeptide N. The upstream coding region utilizes the first three exons of the transcript, a region that has been identified as an imprinting center. Multiple transcription initiation sites have been identified and extensive alternative splicing occurs in the 5' untranslated region but the full-length nature of these transcripts has not been determined. An alternate exon has been identified that substitutes for exon 4 and leads to a truncated, monocistronic transcript. Alternative splicing or deletion caused by a translocation event in the 5' untranslated region or coding region of this gene leads to Angelman syndrome or Prader-Willi syndrome due to parental imprint switch failure. The function of this protein is not yet known.
