= Harry Angelman =

British paediatrician (1915–96)

- Born: 13 August 1915; Birkenhead, England
- Died: 8 August 1996 (aged 80); Portsmouth, England
- Spouse: Audrey

Harry Angelman (13 August 1915 – 8 August 1996) was a British consultant paediatrician who originally identified Angelman syndrome, which was later named after him.

== Biography ==
Angelman was born in Birkenhead in 1915. He qualified in Liverpool in 1938.

He was an enthusiast for the language and country of Italy. He observed three unrelated children who showed similar symptoms of severe intellectual disablement, lack of speech, motor disorders, and happy demeanours. He was in two minds as to whether he should publish his findings, but he described seeing a painting whose name seemed to characterise the symptoms he had observed. The painting showed a laughing boy with a puppet and was by the Renaissance artist Giovanni Francesco Caroto. His 1965 paper described what he called "puppet children", inspired by the painting.

His paper was not immediately recognised as important, but later discoveries of similar children led to the idea of renaming the condition Angelman syndrome.

An American Angelman Syndrome Support Group was started in Waterlooville, Hampshire, in 1986.

Angelman travelled to talk about his discovery, and his work was mentioned as important by U.S. President Bill Clinton.

Angelman died due to a colon tumour.
