= GABRB3 =

Protein-coding gene in the species Homo sapiens

Identifiers
- Aliases: GABRB3, ECA5, gamma-aminobutyric acid type A receptor beta3 subunit, EIEE43, gamma-aminobutyric acid type A receptor subunit beta3, DEE43
- External IDs: OMIM: 137192; MGI: 95621; GeneCards: GABRB3
Available structures
PDB	Ortholog search: PDBe RCSB
PDB	List of PDB id codes 4COF

Gene location (Human)
Chr.	Chromosome 15 (human)
Band	15q12	Start	26,543,546 bp
Band	15q12	End	26,939,539 bp

Gene location (Mouse)
Chr.	Chromosome 7 (mouse)
Band	7 B5|7 33.53 cM	Start	57,069,440 bp
Band	7 B5|7 33.53 cM	End	57,478,550 bp
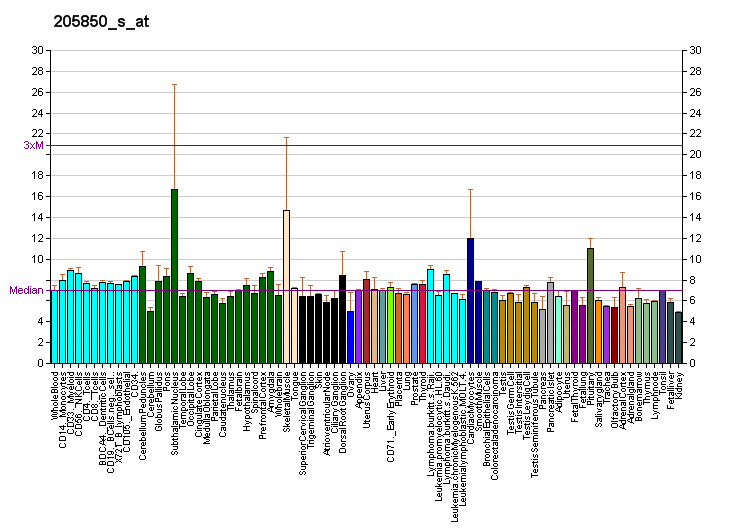
RNA expression pattern
Bgee	Human / Mouse (ortholog); Top expressed in: middle temporal gyrus; Brodmann area 23; entorhinal cortex; endothelial cell; parietal lobe; superior frontal gyrus; postcentral gyrus; lateral nuclear group of thalamus; islet of Langerhans; prefrontal cortex / Top expressed in: olfactory tubercle; lateral septal nucleus; ventromedial nucleus; nucleus accumbens; anterior amygdaloid area; arcuate nucleus; mammillary body; subiculum; olfactory bulb; globus pallidus; More reference expression data
BioGPS	More reference expression data
Gene ontology
Molecular function	GABA-A receptor activity; ion channel activity; chloride channel activity; extracellular ligand-gated ion channel activity; GABA-gated chloride ion channel activity; identical protein binding; transmembrane signaling receptor activity; transmitter-gated ion channel activity involved in regulation of postsynaptic membrane potential
Cellular component	integral component of membrane; postsynaptic membrane; membrane; synapse; integral component of plasma membrane; chloride channel complex; cell junction; GABA-A receptor complex; plasma membrane; cytoplasmic vesicle membrane; cytoplasmic vesicle; neuron projection; GABA-ergic synapse
Biological process	negative regulation of neuron apoptotic process; cochlea development; roof of mouth development; inhibitory postsynaptic potential; regulation of neuron apoptotic process; neuron development; hearing; ion transport; inner ear receptor cell development; chloride transport; innervation; signal transduction; negative regulation of neuron death; cellular response to histamine; chloride transmembrane transport; gamma-aminobutyric acid signaling pathway; ion transmembrane transport; chemical synaptic transmission; regulation of membrane potential; nervous system process; inhibitory synapse assembly
Sources:Amigo / QuickGO
Orthologs
Databases	NCBI: entry; OMA: entry
Species	Human	Mouse
Entrez	2562	14402
Ensembl	ENSG00000166206	ENSMUSG00000033676
UniProt	P28472	P63080
RefSeq (mRNA)	NM_000814; NM_001191320; NM_001191321; NM_001278631; NM_021912	NM_001038701; NM_008071
RefSeq (protein)	NP_000805; NP_001178249; NP_001178250; NP_001265560; NP_068712	NP_001033790; NP_032097
Location (UCSC)	Chr 15: 26.54 – 26.94 Mb	Chr 7: 57.07 – 57.48 Mb
PubMed search
- Wikidata
View/Edit Human	View/Edit Mouse

Gamma-aminobutyric acid receptor subunit beta-3 is a protein that in humans is encoded by the GABRB3 gene. It is located within the 15q12 region in the human genome and spans 250kb. This gene includes 10 exons within its coding region. Due to alternative splicing, the gene codes for many protein isoforms, all being subunits in the GABA_{A} receptor, a ligand-gated ion channel. The beta-3 subunit is expressed at different levels within the cerebral cortex, hippocampus, cerebellum, thalamus, olivary body and piriform cortex of the brain at different points of development and maturity. GABRB3 deficiencies are implicated in many human neurodevelopmental disorders and syndromes such as Angelman syndrome, Prader-Willi syndrome, nonsyndromic orofacial clefts, epilepsy and autism. The effects of methaqualone and etomidate are mediated through GABBR3 positive allosteric modulation.

== Gene ==
The GABRB3 gene is located on the long arm of chromosome 15, within the q12 region in the human genome. It is located in a gene cluster, with two other genes, GABRG3 and GABRA5. GABRB3 was the first gene to be mapped to this particular region. It spans approximately 250kb and includes 10 exons within its coding region, as well as two additional alternative first exons that encode for signaling peptides. Alternatively spliced transcript variants encoding isoforms with distinct signal peptides have been described. This gene is located within an imprinting region that spans the 15q11-13 region. Its sequence is considerably longer than the two other genes found within its gene cluster due to a large 150kb intron it carries. A pattern is observed in GABRB3 gene replication, in humans the maternal allele is replicated later than the paternal allele. The reasoning and implications of this pattern are unknown.

When comparing the human beta-3 subunit's genetic sequence with other vertebrate beta-3 subunit sequences, there is a high level of genetic conservation. In mice the Gabrb3 gene is located on chromosome 7 of its genome in a similar gene cluster style with some of the other subunits of the GABA_{A} receptor.

== Function ==
GABRB3 encodes a member of the ligand-gated ion channel family. The encoded protein is one of at least 13 distinct subunits of a multisubunit chloride channel that serves as the receptor for gamma-aminobutyric acid, the major inhibitory neurotransmitter of the nervous system. The two other genes in the gene cluster both encode for related subunits of the family. During development, when the GABRB3 subunit functions optimally, its role in the GABA_{A} receptor allows for proliferation, migration, and differentiation of precursor cells that lead to the proper development of the brain. GABA_{A} receptor function is inhibited by zinc ions. The ions bind allosterically to the receptor, a mechanism that is critically dependent on the receptor subunit composition.

De novo heterozygous missense mutations within a highly conserved region of the GABRB3 gene can decrease the peak current amplitudes of neurons or alter the kinetic properties of the channel. This results in the loss of the inhibitory properties of the receptor.

The beta-3 subunit has very similar function to the human version of the subunit.

== Structure ==
The crystal structure of a human β3 homopentamer was published in 2014. The study of the crystal structure of the human β3 homopentamer revealed unique qualities that are only observed in eukaryotic cysteine-loop receptors. The characterization of the GABA_{A} receptor and subunits helps with the mechanistic determination of mutations within the subunits and what direct effect the mutations may have on the protein and its interactions.

== Expression ==
The expression of GABRB3 is not constant among all cells or at all stages of development. The distribution of expression of the GABA_{A} receptor subunits (GABRB3 included) during development indicates that GABA may function as a neurotrophic factor, impacting neural differentiation, growth, and circuit organization. The expression of the beta-3 subunit reaches peak at different times in different locations of the brain, during development. The highest expression of Gabrb3 in mice, within the cerebral cortex and hippocampus are reached prenatally, while they are reached postnatally in the cerebellar cortex. After the highest peak of expression, Gabrb3 expression is down-regulated substantially in the thalamus and inferior olivary body of the mouse. By adulthood, the level of expression in the cerebral cortex and hippocampus drops below developmental expression levels, but the expression in the cerebellum does not change postnatally. The highest levels of Gabrb3 expression in the mature mouse brain occur in the Purkinje and granule cells of the cerebellum, the hippocampus, and the piriform cortex.

In humans, the beta-3 subunit, as well as the subunits of its two neighbouring genes (GABRG3 and GABRA5), are bi-allelically expressed within the cerebral cortex, indicating that the gene is not subjected to imprinting within those cells.

=== Imprinting Patterns ===
Due to the location of GABRB3 in the 15q11-13 imprinting region found in humans, this gene is subject to imprinting depending on the location and the cells developmental state. Imprinting is not present in the mouse brain, having an equal expression from maternal and paternal alleles.

== Regulation ==
Phosphorylation of the GABA_{A} by cAMP-dependent protein kinase (PKA) has a regulatory effect dependent on the beta subunit involved. The mechanism by which the kinase is targeted towards the bata-3 subunit is unknown. AKAP79/150 binds directly to the GABRB3 subunit, which is critical for its own phosphorylation, mediated by PKA.

Gabrb3 shows significantly reduced expression postnatally, when mice are deficient in MECP2. When the MECP2 gene is knocked out, the expression of Gabrb3 is reduced, suggesting a relationship of positive regulation between the two genes.

== Clinical significance ==
Mutations in this gene may be associated with the pathogenesis of Angelman syndrome, nonsyndromic orofacial clefts, epilepsy and autism. The GABRB3 gene has been associated with savant skills accompanying such disorders.

In mice, the knockout mutation of Gabrb3 causes severe neonatal mortality with the cleft palate phenotype present, the survivors experiencing hyperactivity, lack of coordination and suffering with epileptic seizures. These mice also exhibit changes to the vestibular system within the ear, resulting in poor swimming skills, difficulty in walking on grid floors, and are found to run in circles erratically.

=== Angelman syndrome ===
Deletion of the GABRB3 gene results in Angelman syndrome in humans, depending on the parental origin of the deletion. Deletion of the paternal allele of GABRB3 has no known implications with this syndrome, while deletion of the maternal GABRB3 allele results in development of the syndrome.

=== Nonsyndromic Orofacial Clefting ===
There is a strong association between GABRB3 expression levels and proper palate development. A disturbance in GABRB3 expression can be lined to the malformation of nonsyndromic cleft lip with or without cleft palate. Cleft lip and palate have also been observed in children who have inverted duplications encompassing the GABRB3 locus. Knockout of the beta-3 subunit in mice results in clefting of the secondary palate. Normal facial characteristics can be restored through the insertion of a Gabrb3 transgene into the mouse genome, making the Gabrb3 gene primarily responsible for cleft palate formation.

=== Autism Spectrum Disorder ===
Duplications of the Prader-Willi/Angelman syndrome region, also known as the imprinting region (15q11-13) that encompasses the GABRB3 gene are present in some patients diagnosed with Autism. These patients exhibit classic symptoms that are associated with the disorder. Duplications of the 15q11-13 region displayed in autistic patients are almost always of maternal origin (not paternal) and account for 1–2% of diagnosed autism disorder cases. This gene is also a candidate for autism because of the physiological response that benzodiazepine has on the GABA-A receptor, when used to treat seizures and anxiety disorders.

The Gabrb3 gene deficient mouse has been proposed as a model of autism spectrum disorder. These mice exhibit similar phenotypic symptoms such as non-selective attention, deficits in a variety of exploratory parameters, sociability, social novelty, nesting and lower rearing frequency as can be equated to characteristics found in patients diagnosed with autism spectrum disorder. When studying Gabrb3 deficient mice, significant hypoplasia of the cerebellar vermis was observed.

There is an unknown association between autism and the 155CA-2 locus, located within an intron in GABRB3.

=== Epilepsy/Childhood absence epilepsy ===
Defects in GABA transmission has often been implicated in epilepsy within animal models and human syndromes. Patients that are diagnosed with Angelman syndrome and have a deletion of the GABRB3 gene exhibit absence seizures. Reduced expression of the beta-3 subunit is a potential contributor to childhood absence epilepsy.

== See also ==
- GABAA receptor
- Heritability of autism
