= Monosomy =

Presence of only one chromosome from a pair

- Specialty: Medical genetics

Schematic karyogram of a human, showing the normal diploid karyotype. It shows annotated bands and sub-bands as used for the nomenclature of chromosome abnormalities including partial monosomies. It shows 22 homologous chromosomes, both the female (XX) and male (XY) versions of the sex chromosome (bottom right), as well as the mitochondrial genome (to scale at bottom left).

Monosomy is a form of aneuploidy with the presence of only one chromosome from a pair. Partial monosomy occurs when a portion of one chromosome in a pair is missing.

== Human monosomy ==
Human conditions due to monosomy:

- Turner syndrome – Females with Turner syndrome typically have one X chromosome instead of the usual two X chromosomes. Turner syndrome is the only full monosomy that is seen in humans — all other cases of full monosomy are lethal and the individual will not survive development.
- Cri du chat syndrome – (French for "cry of the cat" after the person's malformed larynx) a partial monosomy caused by a deletion of the end of the short arm of chromosome 5
- 1p36 deletion syndrome – a partial monosomy caused by a deletion at the end of the short arm of chromosome 1
- 17q12 microdeletion syndrome – a partial monosomy caused by a deletion of part of the long arm of chromosome 17

== In embryos ==
Analyses of the products of human miscarriages show that the majority of aneuploidies (trisomies or monosomies) in early developing embryos arise from errors occurring during maternal meiosis and that paternal meiotic errors contribute less than 10%. This bias may be due to the complexity of meiosis in oogenesis and the extremely prolonged arrest during meiosis that is prone to errors. However, in embryos that have developed to the cleavage stage, an equal maternal, paternal contribution to monosomies is observed.

== See also ==
- Anaphase lag
- Miscarriage
- Nullisomic
