= UBE3A =

Protein found in humans

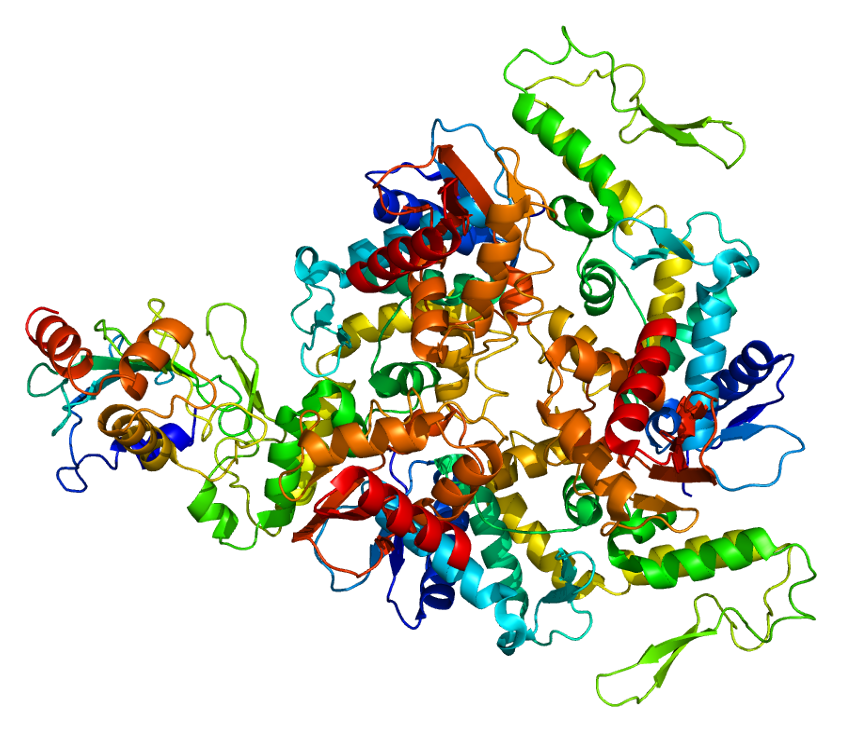

Identifiers
- Aliases: UBE3A, ANCR, AS, E6-AP, EPVE6AP, HPVE6A, ubiquitin protein ligase E3A, PIX1
- External IDs: OMIM: 601623; MGI: 105098; GeneCards: UBE3A
Available structures
PDB	Ortholog search: PDBe RCSB
PDB	List of PDB id codes 4GIZ, 1C4Z, 1D5F, 1EQX, 2KR1
Enzyme activity
EC #	BRENDA	ExPASy	KEGG	MetaCyc
2.3.2.26	↗	↗	↗	↗

Gene location (Human)
Chr.	Chromosome 15 (human)
Band	15q11.2	Start	25,333,728 bp
Band	15q11.2	End	25,439,051 bp

Gene location (Mouse)
Chr.	Chromosome 7 (mouse)
Band	7 B5|7 33.95 cM	Start	59,228,750 bp
Band	7 B5|7 33.95 cM	End	59,311,536 bp
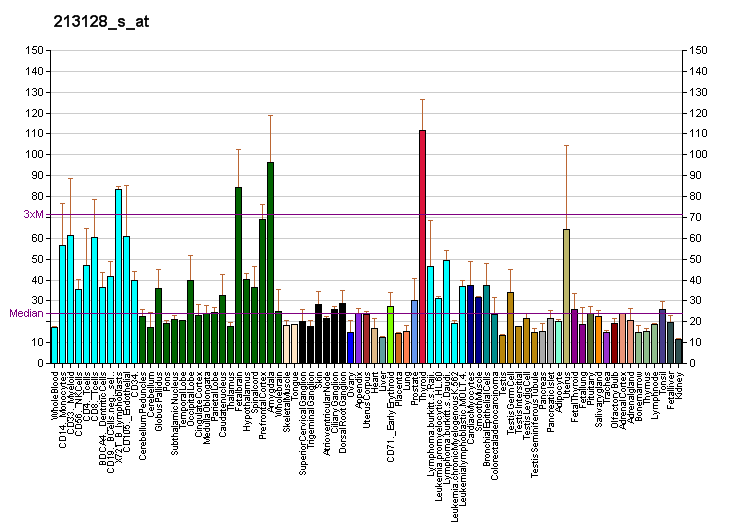

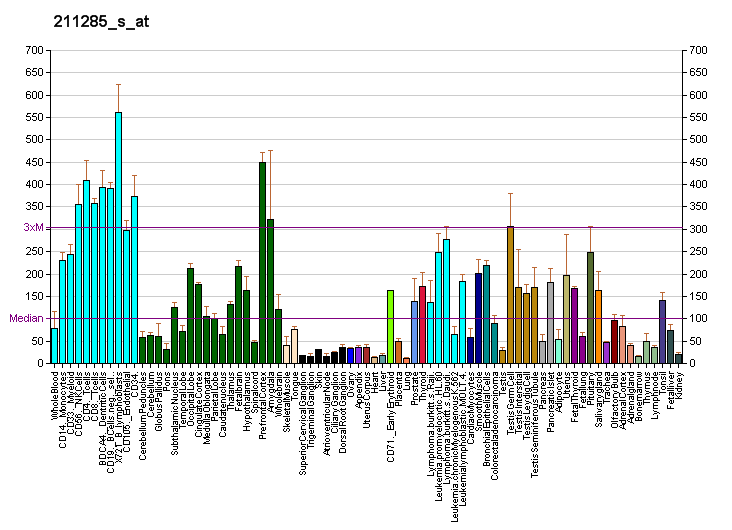

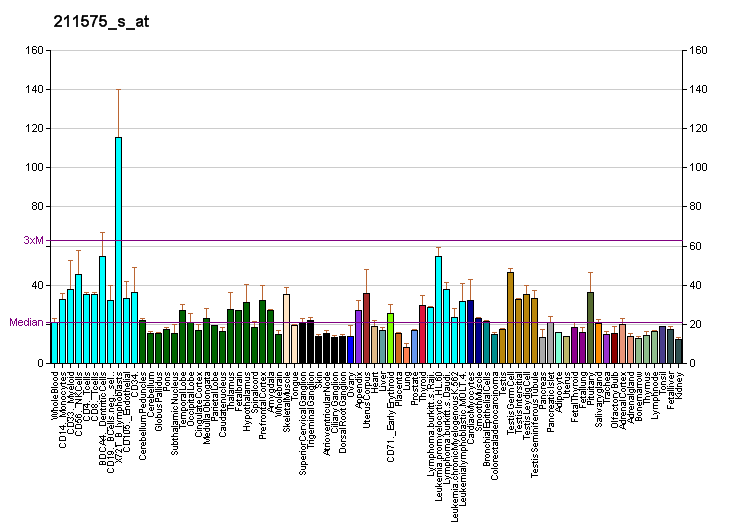
RNA expression pattern
Bgee	Human / Mouse (ortholog); Top expressed in: sperm; Skeletal muscle tissue of rectus abdominis; Achilles tendon; Skeletal muscle tissue of biceps brachii; mucosa of paranasal sinus; nipple; Epithelium of choroid plexus; vastus lateralis muscle; pylorus; cardia / Top expressed in: Rostral migratory stream; vas deferens; pineal gland; ventromedial nucleus; medial ganglionic eminence; arcuate nucleus; efferent ductule; median eminence; paraventricular nucleus of hypothalamus; lateral septal nucleus; More reference expression data
BioGPS	More reference expression data
Gene ontology
Molecular function	metal ion binding; transcription coactivator activity; ubiquitin-protein transferase activity; protein binding; ubiquitin protein ligase activity; transferase activity
Cellular component	cytosol; proteasome complex; nucleus; cytoplasm
Biological process	ubiquitin-dependent protein catabolic process; prostate gland growth; rhythmic process; proteolysis; positive regulation of phosphatidylinositol 3-kinase signaling; protein K48-linked ubiquitination; viral process; brain development; regulation of ubiquitin-dependent protein catabolic process; ovarian follicle development; sperm entry; protein ubiquitination; positive regulation of protein ubiquitination; positive regulation of transcription by RNA polymerase II; protein autoubiquitination; regulation of circadian rhythm; androgen receptor signaling pathway; response to progesterone; progesterone receptor signaling pathway; protein polyubiquitination; proteasome-mediated ubiquitin-dependent protein catabolic process; response to cocaine; response to hydrogen peroxide; negative regulation of dendritic spine morphogenesis; cellular response to brain-derived neurotrophic factor stimulus
Sources:Amigo / QuickGO
Orthologs
Databases	NCBI: entry; OMA: entry
Species	Human	Mouse
Entrez	7337	22215
Ensembl	ENSG00000114062	ENSMUSG00000025326
UniProt	Q05086	O08759
RefSeq (mRNA)	NM_000462; NM_130838; NM_130839; NM_001354505; NM_001354506 NM_001354509; NM_001354512; NM_001354523; NM_001354526; NM_001354540; NM_001354541; NM_001354543; NM_001354545; NM_001354547; NM_001354549; NM_001354550; NM_001354507; NM_001354508; NM_001354511; NM_001354513; NM_001354538; NM_001354539; NM_001354542; NM_001354544; NM_001354546; NM_001354548; NM_001354551; NM_001374461	NM_001033962; NM_011668; NM_173010
RefSeq (protein)	NP_000453; NP_570853; NP_570854; NP_001341434; NP_001341435 NP_001341438; NP_001341441; NP_001341452; NP_001341455; NP_001341469; NP_001341470; NP_001341472; NP_001341474; NP_001341476; NP_001341478; NP_001341479; NP_001341436; NP_001341437; NP_001341440; NP_001341442; NP_001341467; NP_001341468; NP_001341471; NP_001341473; NP_001341475; NP_001341477; NP_001341480; NP_001361390	NP_001029134; NP_035798; NP_001380595; NP_001380597; NP_001380598 NP_001380599; NP_001380600; NP_001380601; NP_766598; NP_001380902
Location (UCSC)	Chr 15: 25.33 – 25.44 Mb	Chr 7: 59.23 – 59.31 Mb
PubMed search
- Wikidata
View/Edit Human	View/Edit Mouse

Ubiquitin-protein ligase E3A (UBE3A) also known as E6AP ubiquitin-protein ligase (E6AP) is an enzyme that in humans is encoded by the UBE3A gene. This enzyme is involved in targeting proteins for degradation within cells.

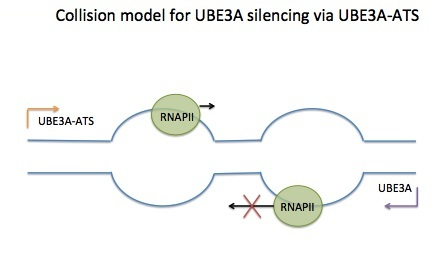
Collision model of UBE3A

== Gene ==
The UBE3A gene is located on the long (q) arm of chromosome 15 between positions 11 and 13, from base pair 23,133,488 to base pair 23,235,220.

Silencing of Ube3a on the paternal allele is thought to occur through the Ube3a-ATS part of a lincRNA called "LNCAT" (Large Non-Coding Antisense Transcript).

== Tissue distribution ==
Both copies of the UBE3A gene are active in most of the body's tissues. In most neurons, however, only the copy inherited from a person's mother (the maternal copy) is normally active; this is known as paternal imprinting. Recent evidence shows that at least some glial cells and neurons may exhibit biallelic expression of UBE3A. Further work is thus needed to delineate a complete map of UBE3A imprinting in humans and model organisms such as mice.

== Function ==
The UBE3A gene encodes ubiquitin protein ligase E3A (also known as E6AP), a multifunctional enzyme that plays a crucial role in cellular protein homeostasis and neural development. Its primary function is to act as an E3 ubiquitin ligase, attaching ubiquitin molecules to specific substrate proteins, thereby marking them for degradation by the proteasome system. This process is essential for removing damaged or unnecessary proteins, maintaining cellular health, and regulating the balance of protein synthesis and degradation (proteostasis) at synapses, which is vital for synaptic plasticity, learning, and memory. In addition to its ligase activity, UBE3A also serves as a transcriptional co-activator, influencing the expression of genes involved in hormone signaling and neural function. Notably, in neurons, only the maternal copy of the UBE3A gene is typically active due to genomic imprinting, and disruptions in its expression are linked to neurodevelopmental disorders such as Angelman syndrome and autism spectrum disorders. UBE3A's precise regulation is therefore critical for normal brain development and function, as both loss and overexpression can lead to significant neurological and behavioral abnormalities.

== Clinical significance ==
Mutations within the UBE3A gene are responsible for some cases of Angelman syndrome and Prader–Willi syndrome. Most of these mutations result in an abnormally short, nonfunctional version of ubiquitin protein ligase E3A. Because the copy of the gene inherited from a person's father (the paternal copy) is normally inactive in the brain, a mutation in the remaining maternal copy prevents any of the enzyme from being produced in the brain. This loss of enzyme function likely causes the characteristic features of these two conditions.

The UBE3A gene lies within the human chromosomal region 15q11-13. Other abnormalities in this region of chromosome 15 can also cause Dup15q and Isodicentric 15. These chromosomal changes include deletions, rearrangements (translocations) of genetic material, and other abnormalities. Like mutations within the gene, these chromosomal changes prevent any functional ubiquitin protein ligase E3A from being produced in the brain.

UBE3A associates with the E6 protein of certain strains of HPV. This interaction promotes the polyubiquitination and subsequent degradation of the tumor suppressor gene p53, thereby enabling the immortalization of infected cells. Strains of HPV with this ability have a higher risk of causing HPV-associated cancers. UBE3A is also known as E6AP or E6-associated protein in reference to this mechanism.

== Interactions ==
UBE3A has been shown to interact with:

- BLK,
- Lck,
- MCM7,
- MECP2,
- Progesterone receptor,
- TSC2,
- UBE2D1,
- UBE2D2,
- UBE2L3,
- UBQLN1, and
- UBQLN2.
