= Isodisomy =

Erroneous duplication of one parent's chromosome during meiosis

- Specialty: Obstetrics, pediatrics
- Symptoms: variable
- Causes: Genetic and environmental factors
- Diagnostic method: Amniocentesis, medical imaging
- Deaths: sometimes fatal

Isodisomy is a form of uniparental disomy in which both copies of a chromosome, or parts of it, are inherited from the same parent. It differs from heterodisomy in that instead of a complete pair of homologous chromosomes, the fertilized ovum contains two identical copies of a single parental chromosome. This may result in the expression of recessive traits in the offspring. Some authors use the term uniparental disomy and isodisomy interchangeably.

This genetic abnormality can result in the birth of a normal child who has no obvious disability. It is associated with abnormalities in the growth of the offspring and in the placenta. Isodisomy may be a common phenomenon in human cells, and "might play a role in the pathogenesis of various nonmalignant disorders and might explain local impaired function and/or clinical variability."

== Bibliography ==
- Leveno, Kenneth (2013). Williams manual of pregnancy complications. New York: McGraw-Hill Medical. ISBN 9780071765626.
