= Nullisomic =

Condition of lacking chromosomes

Nullisomic is a genetic condition involving the lack of both the normal chromosomal pairs for a species (2n-2). Humans with this condition will not survive.

== Causes ==
Nullisomy is caused by non-disjunction, during meiosis that causes two of the gametes to have no chromosomal material, leaving the other two gametes to have double the amount of chromosomal material (disomic). Due to the lack of genetic information, the nullisomic gametes are rendered unviable for fertilization.

== See also ==
- Monosomic
- Trisomic
