= Small nuclear ribonucleoprotein polypeptide N =

Protein-coding gene in the species Homo sapiens

SNRPN
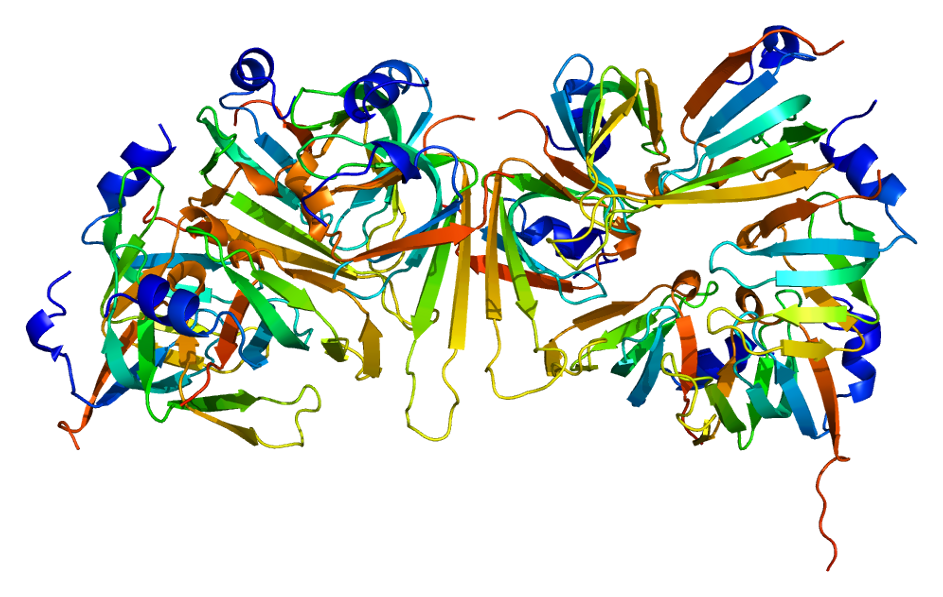

Identifiers
- Aliases: SNRPN, HCERN3, PWCR, RT-LI, SM-D, SMN, SNRNP-N, SNURF-sm-N, Small nuclear ribonucleoprotein polypeptide N
- External IDs: OMIM: 182279; MGI: 98347; GeneCards: SNRPN

Gene location (Human)
Chr.	Chromosome 15 (human)
Band	15q11.2	Start	24,823,637 bp
Band	15q11.2	End	24,978,723 bp
RNA expression pattern
Bgee	Human / Mouse (ortholog); Top expressed in: superior frontal gyrus; prefrontal cortex; primary visual cortex; cerebellum; cerebellar cortex; cerebellar hemisphere; right frontal lobe; right hemisphere of cerebellum; Brodmann area 9; hypothalamus / n/a; More reference expression data
BioGPS	n/a
Gene ontology
Molecular function	protein binding; RNA binding
Cellular component	cytoplasm; U5 snRNP; catalytic step 2 spliceosome; U4/U6 x U5 tri-snRNP complex; spliceosomal complex; U4 snRNP; small nuclear ribonucleoprotein complex; U2-type prespliceosome; nucleus; nucleoplasm; U1 snRNP; U2 snRNP
Biological process	RNA splicing; mRNA splicing, via spliceosome; response to hormone
Sources:Amigo / QuickGO
Orthologs
Databases	NCBI: entry; OMA: entry
Species	Human	Mouse
Entrez	6638	20646
Ensembl	ENSG00000128739	n/a
UniProt	P63162	P63163
RefSeq (mRNA)	NM_001349454; NM_001349455; NM_001349456; NM_001349457; NM_001349458 NM_001349459; NM_001349460; NM_001349461; NM_001349462; NM_001349463; NM_001349464; NM_001349465; NM_003097; NM_022805; NM_022806; NM_022807; NM_022808; NM_001378249; NM_001378251; NM_001378252; NM_001378253; NM_001378254; NM_001378255; NM_001378256; NM_001378257	NM_001082961; NM_001082962; NM_013670
RefSeq (protein)	NP_003088; NP_073716; NP_073717; NP_073718; NP_073719 NP_001336383; NP_001336384; NP_001336385; NP_001336386; NP_001336387; NP_001336388; NP_001336389; NP_001336390; NP_001336391; NP_001336392; NP_001336393; NP_001336394; NP_001365178; NP_001365180; NP_001365181; NP_001365182; NP_001365183; NP_001365184; NP_001365185; NP_001365186	NP_001076430; NP_001076431; NP_038698; NP_001336619; NP_001336620 NP_001336621; NP_001336622; NP_001336623; NP_001336624
Location (UCSC)	Chr 15: 24.82 – 24.98 Mb	n/a
PubMed search
- Wikidata
View/Edit Human	View/Edit Mouse

Small nuclear ribonucleoprotein-associated protein N is a protein that in humans is encoded by the SNRPN gene.

The protein encoded by this gene is one polypeptide of a small nuclear ribonucleoprotein complex and belongs to the snRNP SMB/SMN family. The protein plays a role in pre-mRNA processing, possibly tissue-specific alternative splicing events. Although individual snRNPs are believed to recognize specific nucleic acid sequences through RNA-RNA base pairing, the specific role of this family member is unknown. The protein arises from a bicistronic transcript that also encodes a protein identified as the SNRPN upstream reading frame (SNURF). Multiple transcription initiation sites have been identified and extensive alternative splicing occurs in the 5' untranslated region. Additional splice variants have been described but sequences for the complete transcripts have not been determined. The 5' UTR of this gene has been identified as an imprinting center. Alternative splicing or deletion caused by a translocation event in this paternally-expressed region is responsible for Prader-Willi syndrome due to parental imprint switch failure.

SNRPN-methylation is used to detect uniparental disomy of chromosome 15. After fluorescent-in-situ-hybridization has confirmed the presence of either SNRPN or UBE3A (a neighboring gene that is also imprinted), the methylation test (of SNRPN) can reveal whether the patient has uniparental disomy. SNRPN is maternally methylated (silenced). UBE3A appears to be paternally methylated (silenced).
