= Down syndrome research =

Research of Down syndrome–related genes

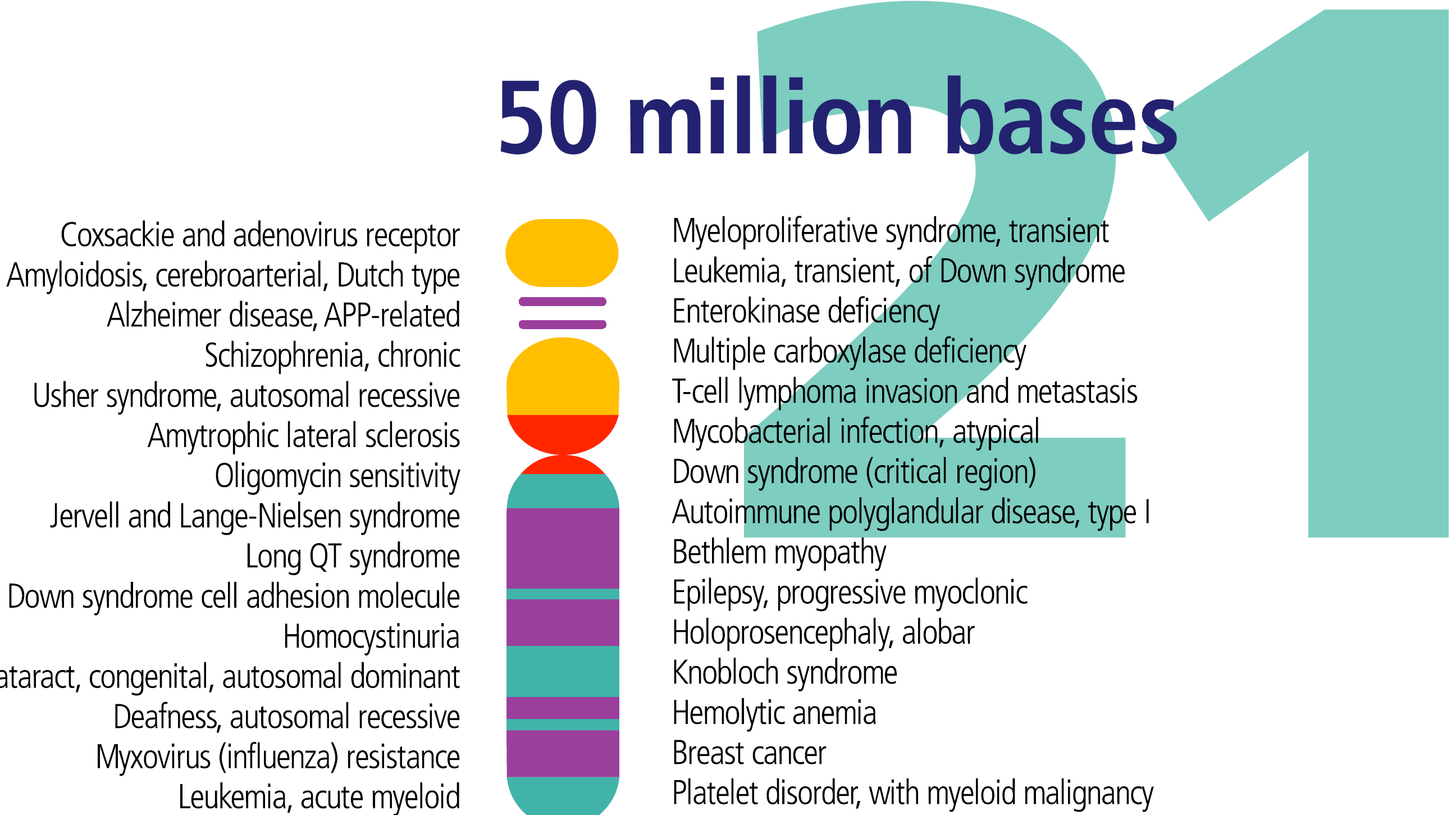
Chromosome 21 from Human Genome Program

Research related to Down syndrome focuses on the genes located on chromosome 21. In general, this leads to an overexpression of the genes. Understanding the genes involved may help to target medical treatment to individuals with Down syndrome. It is estimated that chromosome 21 contains 200 to 250 genes. Recent research has identified a region of the chromosome that contains the main genes responsible for the pathogenesis of Down syndrome, located proximal to 21q22.3. The search for major genes involved in Down syndrome characteristics is normally in the region 21q21–21q22.3.

== Genes ==
Some suspected genes involved in features of Down syndrome are given in the Table 1:

Table 1: Some genes located on the long arm of chromosome 21
Gene	OMIM Reference	Location	Purported Function
APP	104760	21q21	Amyloid precursor protein A4 precursor protein. Suspected to have a major role in cognitive difficulties. One of the first genes studied with transgenic mice with Down syndrome.
SOD1	147450	21q22.1	Superoxide dismutase. Possible role in Alzheimer's disease. Anti-oxidant as well as possible effects on the immuno-system.
DYRK	600855	21q22.1	Dual-specificity Tyrosine Phosphorylation-Regulated Kinase 1A. May have an effect on mental development through abnormal neurogenesis.
IFNAR	107450	21q22.1	Interferon, Alpha, Beta, and Omega, Receptor. Responsible for the expression of interferon, which affects the immuno-system.
DSCR1	602917	21q22.1–21q22.2	Down Syndrome Critical Region Gene 1. Possibly part of a signal transduction pathway involving both heart and brain.
COL6A1	120220	21q22.3	Collagen, type I, alpha 1 gene. May have an effect on heart disease.
ETS2	164740	21q22.3	Avian Erythroblastosis Virus E26 Oncogene Homolog 2. Researchers have "demonstrated that overexpression of ETS2 results in apoptosis. Transgenic mice overexpressing ETS2 developed a smaller thymus and lymphocyte abnormalities, similar to features observed in Down syndrome." ETS2-Transgenic mice were also shown to "develop neurocranial, viscerocranial and cervical skeletal abnormalities", similar skeletal abnormalities to those seen in Down syndrome.
CRYA1	123580	21q22.3	Crystallin, Alpha-A. Involved in the synthesis of crystallin, a major component of the lens in eyes. May be cause of cataracts.

== General research ==
Research by Arron et al. shows that some of the phenotypes associated with Down syndrome can be related to the disregulation of transcription factors (596), and in particular, NFAT. NFAT is controlled in part by two proteins, DSCR1 and DYRK1A; these genes are located on chromosome-21 (Epstein 582). In people with Down syndrome, these proteins have 1.5 times greater concentration than normal (Arron et al. 597). The elevated levels of DSCR1 and DYRK1A keep NFAT primarily located in the cytoplasm rather than in the nucleus, preventing NFATc from activating the transcription of target genes and thus the production of certain proteins (Epstein 583).

This disregulation was discovered by testing in transgenic mice that had segments of their chromosomes duplicated to simulate a human chromosome-21 trisomy (Arron et al. 597). A test involving grip strength showed that the genetically modified mice had a significantly weaker grip, much like the characteristically poor muscle tone of an individual with Down syndrome (Arron et al. 596). The mice squeezed a probe with a paw and displayed a 0.2 newton weaker grip (Arron et al. 596). Down syndrome is also characterized by increased socialization. When modified and unmodified mice were observed for social interaction, the modified mice showed as much as 25% more interactions as compared to the unmodified mice (Arron et al. 596).

The genes that may be responsible for the phenotypes associated may be located proximal to 21q22.3. Testing by Olson and others in transgenic mice show the duplicated genes presumed to cause the phenotypes are not enough to cause the exact features. While the mice had sections of multiple genes duplicated to approximate a human chromosome-21 triplication, they only showed slight craniofacial abnormalities (688–90). The transgenic mice were compared to mice that had no gene duplication by measuring distances on various points on their skeletal structure and comparing them to the normal mice (Olson et al. 687). The exact characteristics of Down syndrome were not observed, so more genes involved for Down syndrome phenotypes have to be located elsewhere.

Reeves et al., using 250 clones of chromosome-21 and specific gene markers, were able to map the gene in mutated bacteria. The testing had 99.7% coverage of the gene with 99.9995% accuracy due to multiple redundancies in the mapping techniques. In the study 225 genes were identified (311–13).

The search for major genes that may be involved in Down syndrome symptoms is normally in the region 21q21–21q22.3. However, studies by Reeves et al. show that 41% of the genes on chromosome-21 have no functional purpose, and only 54% of functional genes have a known protein sequence. Functionality of genes was determined by a computer using exon prediction analysis (312). Exon sequence was obtained by the same procedures of the chromosome-21 mapping.

Research has led to an understanding that two genes located on chromosome-21, that code for proteins that control gene regulators, DSCR1 and DYRK1A can be responsible for some of the phenotypes associated with Down syndrome. DSCR1 and DYRK1A cannot be blamed outright for the symptoms; there are a lot of genes that have no known purpose. Much more research would be needed to produce any appropriate or ethically acceptable treatment options.

Recent use of transgenic mice to study specific genes in the Down syndrome critical region has yielded some results. APP is an Amyloid beta A4 precursor protein. It is suspected to have a major role in cognitive difficulties. Another gene, ETS2, is Avian Erythroblastosis Virus E26 Oncogene Homolog 2. Researchers have "demonstrated that over-expression of ETS2 results in apoptosis. Transgenic mice over-expressing ETS2 developed a smaller thymus and lymphocyte abnormalities, similar to features observed in Down syndrome."

== Specific genes ==
=== Amyloid beta (APP) ===
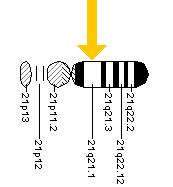
Location of the APP gene on chromosome 21 in humans

One chromosome 21 gene that might predispose Down syndrome individuals to develop Alzheimer's pathology is the gene that encodes the precursor of the amyloid protein. Neurofibrillary tangles and amyloid plaques are commonly found in both Down syndrome and Alzheimer's individuals. Layer II of the entorhinal cortex and the subiculum, both critical for memory consolidation, are among the first affected by the damage. A gradual decrease in the number of nerve cells throughout the cortex follows. A few years ago, Johns Hopkins scientists created a genetically engineered mouse called Ts65Dn (segmental trisomy 16 mouse) as an excellent model for studying the Down syndrome. Ts65Dn mouse has genes on chromosomes 16 that are very similar to the human chromosome 21 genes. Recently, researchers have used this transgenic mouse to connect APP to cognitive problems among the mice.

=== Superoxide dismutase (SOD1) ===
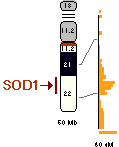
Location of the SOD1 gene on chromosome 21 in humans

Some (but not all) studies have shown that the activity of the superoxide dismutase enzyme is elevated in Down syndrome. SOD converts oxygen radicals to hydrogen peroxide and water. Oxygen radicals produced in cells can be damaging to cellular structures, hence the important role of SOD. However, the hypothesis says that once SOD activity increases disproportionately to enzymes responsible for removal of hydrogen peroxide (e.g., glutathione peroxidase), the cells will suffer from a peroxide damage. Some scientists believe that the treatment of Down syndrome neurons with free radical scavengers can substantially prevent neuronal degeneration. Oxidative damage to neurons results in rapid brain aging similar to that of Alzheimer's disease.

== Oxidative stress ==
The DNA oxidation product 8-OHdG is a well-established marker of oxidative DNA damage arising from oxidative stress and the excessive production of reactive oxygen species. The levels of 8-OHdG in the DNA of persons with DS measured in saliva were found to be significantly higher than in control groups. 8-OHdG levels were also found to be higher in urine, leukocytes and fibroblasts of persons with DS compared to controls. Both fetal and adult DS fibroblasts are defective in the removal of 8-OHdG as compared with age-matched cells from control healthy donors These findings suggest that oxidative DNA damage may underlie some of the clinical and premature aging features of DS.

== MicroRNA genes ==
Human chromosome 21 contains five microRNA genes: miR-99a, let-7c, miR-125b-2, miR-155, and miR-802.

== Epigenetic studies of accelerated aging effects ==
Trisomy 21 entails an increased risk of many chronic diseases that are typically associated with older age such as an increased risk of Alzheimer's disease. The clinical manifestations of accelerated aging suggest that trisomy 21 increases the biological age of tissues, but molecular evidence for this hypothesis has been sparse. According to a biomarker of tissue age known as epigenetic clock, trisomy 21 significantly increases the age of blood and brain tissue (on average by 6.6 years).
