= Anaphase lag =

Improper chromosomal separation during cell division

Anaphase lag is a consequence of an event during cell division where sister chromatids do not properly separate from each other because of improper spindle formation. The chromosome or chromatid does not properly migrate during anaphase and the daughter cells will lose some genetic information. It is one of many causes of aneuploidy. This event can occur during both meiosis and mitosis with unique repercussions. In either case, anaphase lag will cause one daughter cell to receive a complete set of chromosomes while the other lacks one paired set of chromosomes, creating a form of monosomy. Whether the cell survives depends on which sister chromatid was lost and the background genomic state of the cell. The passage of abnormal numbers of chromosomes will have unique consequences with regard to mosaicism and development as well as the progression and heterogeneity of cancers.

== Mechanisms ==
There are two notable mechanisms that cause Anaphase Lag, each of which are characterized by merotelic attachments of kinetochores to the microtubules responsible for chromatid separation. Merotelic attachments occur when a single centromere kinetochore attaches to microtubules originating from both spindle poles of the dividing cell. The merotelic attachments can occur in two ways: centrosome spindle attachments from both poles on the same chromatid kinetochore or the formation of a third centrosome whose microtubule spindles attach to a chromatid kinetochore. Because the chromatid is being pulled in two opposing directions or away from the correct centriole, it cannot migrate to the mass of segregated chromatids at either pole. If the migration is significantly delayed the reformation of nuclei will begin to occur without a full complement of chromosomes. This nuclear envelope formation is also seen for the lone lagging sister chromatid, forming a micronucleus. The micronucleus has the capacity to persist in the daughter cell but with abnormal replication and maintenance machinery. This allows for the accumulation of mutations, increasing the potential for future miss-segregation events. In total these events cause problematic aneuploid cells with increased genomic instability. This has important implications in the development and persistence of cancers as well as debilitating developmental diseases.

== Hallmark of cancer ==
One of the hallmarks of cancer formation and persistence is genomic instability, referring to the increased frequency in sequence mutation, chromosome rearrangement, and aneuploidy. The instability allows a cancerous growth to increasingly diverge from normal cell growth and division, with the potential to gain new traits such as angiogenesis, immune system evasion, and loss of cell cycle checkpoint genes. Aneuploidy is a drastic divergence from the normal karyotype, as such the potential heterogeneity within these cells makes diagnosis and treatment increasingly difficult.

== Genomic causes ==
The increasing importance of genomic instability on cancer progression has been emphasized in recent years. There are many ways to cause aneuploidy, however the genomic predispositions for these events are less well understood. In regard to the merotelic kinetochore attachments associated with anaphase lag, several genes have been implicated. Aurora B is a kinase active in late metaphase, and has been shown to function as a checkpoint for the proper attachments of centriole spindles to the chromatid kinetochores. When Aurora B was partially inhibited by a small molecule drug, Cimini et al. observed lagging chromatids at increasing frequency. Similarly, mutations to the gene Stag2 have been associated with increased aneuploidy in cancers. Stag2 encodes a cohesin protein responsible for holding sister chromatids together pre-anaphase. Imaging of cells with Stag2 knock-outs showed increased frequency of lagging anaphase chromatids; subsequent gene correction in human glioblastoma cell lines reduced the occurrence of this genomic instability.

== Prognosis and treatment ==
Consequent of this genomic instability, the resulting cancer cells have the potential to diverge in sequence and gain new traits. This intratumoral heterogeneity creates a tumor mass with different genomic backgrounds as well as unique cellular traits and drug susceptibilities. Several research groups have shown that heterogeneity and genomic instability are heavily correlated with poor patient outcomes and aggressive cancers. Chang-Min Choi et al. examined the survival of individuals with adenocarcinoma of the lung. Those individuals with higher rates of chromosome instability were associated with worse 5-year survival curves. This was similarly observed in a colorectal study by Walther et al. These more aggressive heterogenous tumors also provide unique difficulties for treatment regimens. To support this hypothesis, Duesberg et al. tested drug susceptibility on cell lines with and without aneuploidy. While the diploid cell lines remained drug sensitive, the aneuploid lines showed marked increases in mutation rates, drug resistance, and unintended morphological changes to cell phenotypes. As the importance of genomic instability in cancer prognosis/treatment continues, identifying the causes and consequences of mechanisms such as anaphase lag will be critical to understanding how cancer develops as well as developing better multi-target therapies.
