= GABRG3 =

Protein-coding gene in the species Homo sapiens

Identifiers
- Aliases: GABRG3, gamma-aminobutyric acid type A receptor gamma3 subunit, gamma-aminobutyric acid type A receptor subunit gamma3
- External IDs: OMIM: 600233; MGI: 95624; GeneCards: GABRG3

Gene location (Human)
Chr.	Chromosome 15 (human)
Band	15q12	Start	26,971,181 bp
Band	15q12	End	27,541,984 bp

Gene location (Mouse)
Chr.	Chromosome 7 (mouse)
Band	7 B5|7 33.48 cM	Start	56,366,213 bp
Band	7 B5|7 33.48 cM	End	57,036,936 bp
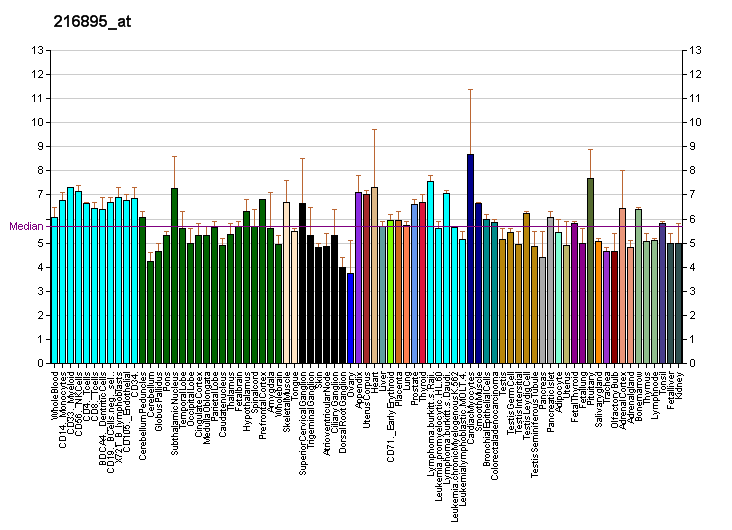
RNA expression pattern
Bgee	Human / Mouse (ortholog); Top expressed in: testicle; right testis; left testis; prefrontal cortex; gonad; anterior pituitary; sperm; Brodmann area 9; hypothalamus; cingulate gyrus / Top expressed in: epithelium of lens; lumbar subsegment of spinal cord; nucleus accumbens; superior frontal gyrus; lateral septal nucleus; dorsal striatum; prefrontal cortex; dentate gyrus of hippocampal formation granule cell; lumbar spinal ganglion; primary visual cortex; More reference expression data
BioGPS	More reference expression data
Gene ontology
Molecular function	chloride channel activity; extracellular ligand-gated ion channel activity; GABA-A receptor activity; ion channel activity; transmembrane signaling receptor activity; inhibitory extracellular ligand-gated ion channel activity; benzodiazepine receptor activity; GABA-gated chloride ion channel activity; transmitter-gated ion channel activity involved in regulation of postsynaptic membrane potential
Cellular component	integral component of membrane; cell junction; plasma membrane; postsynaptic membrane; synapse; membrane; chloride channel complex; GABA-ergic synapse; integral component of synaptic membrane; integral component of plasma membrane; dendrite membrane; neuron projection; postsynapse; GABA-A receptor complex
Biological process	gamma-aminobutyric acid signaling pathway; chloride transport; chloride transmembrane transport; ion transport; ion transmembrane transport; signal transduction; chemical synaptic transmission; regulation of membrane potential; nervous system process; synaptic transmission, GABAergic; regulation of postsynaptic membrane potential
Sources:Amigo / QuickGO
Orthologs
Databases	NCBI: entry; OMA: entry
Species	Human	Mouse
Entrez	2567	14407
Ensembl	ENSG00000182256	ENSMUSG00000055026
UniProt	Q99928	P27681
RefSeq (mRNA)	NM_001270873; NM_033223	NM_008074; NM_177273
RefSeq (protein)	NP_001257802; NP_150092	NP_032100
Location (UCSC)	Chr 15: 26.97 – 27.54 Mb	Chr 7: 56.37 – 57.04 Mb
PubMed search
- Wikidata
View/Edit Human	View/Edit Mouse

GABA_{A} receptor-γ3, also known as GABRG3, is a protein which in humans is encoded by the GABRG3 gene.

== Function ==
GABRG3 is a subunit of the GABA_{A} receptor for the neurotransmitter gamma-Aminobutyric acid (GABA).

== Association with alcoholism ==
Genetic markers near the GABRG3 gene are statistically linked to alcoholism.

== See also ==
- GABAA receptor
