= Angelman syndrome =

Genetic disorder caused by a mutation of chromosome 15

- Other names: Angelman's syndrome
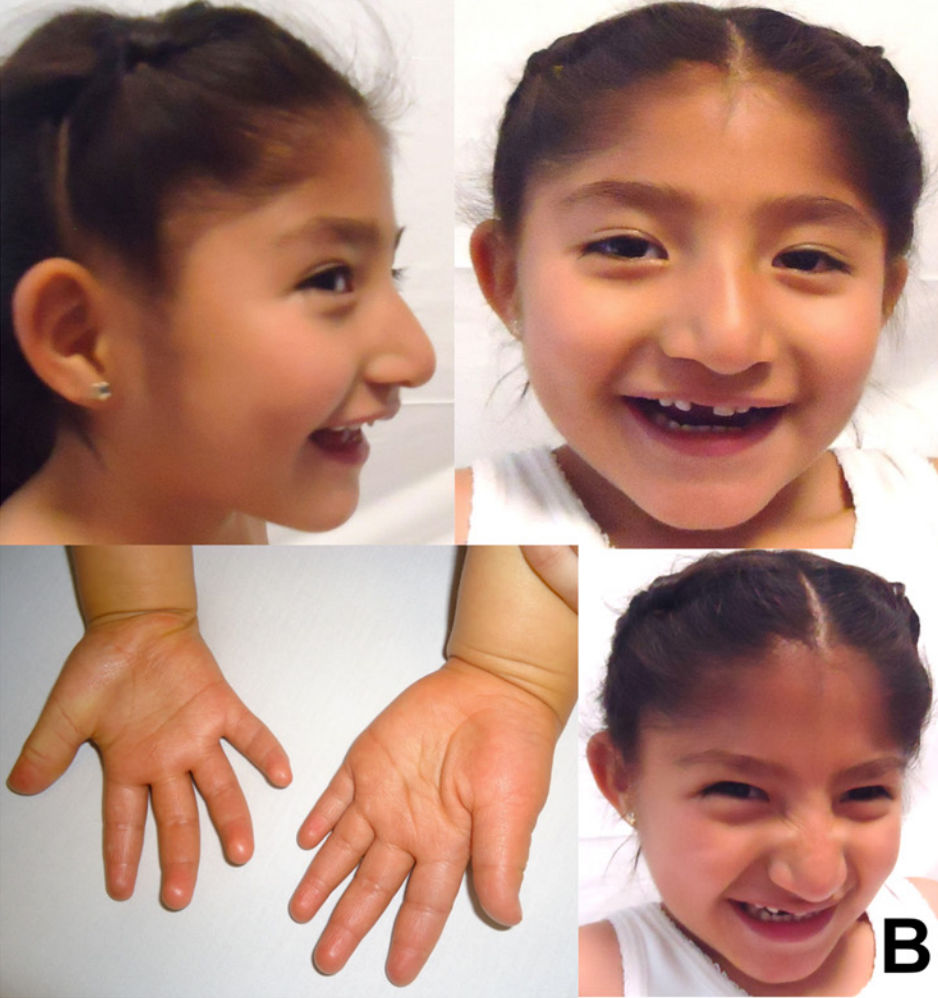
- A five-year-old girl with Angelman syndrome. Features shown include telecanthus, bilateral epicanthic folds, small head, wide mouth, and an apparently happy demeanor; hands with tapered fingers, abnormal creases and broad thumbs.
- Pronunciation: /ˈæŋɡəlmən/, /ˈændʒəlmən/, or /ˈeɪndʒəlmən/
- Specialty: Medical genetics
- Symptoms: Delayed development, happy demeanor, intellectual disability, limited to no functional speech, balance and movement problems, small head, seizures
- Usual onset: Noticeable by 6–12 months
- Causes: Genetic (new mutation)
- Diagnostic method: Based on symptoms, genetic testing
- Differential diagnosis: Cerebral palsy, autism, Rett syndrome, Prader–Willi syndrome
- Treatment: Supportive care
- Prognosis: Nearly normal life expectancy
- Frequency: 1 in 12,000 to 20,000 people

Angelman syndrome (AS) is a rare genetic disorder that affects approximately 1 in 15,000 individuals. AS impairs the function of the nervous system, producing symptoms such as severe intellectual disability, developmental disability, limited to no functional speech, balance and movement problems, seizures, hyperactivity, and sleep problems. Physical symptoms include a small head and a specific facial appearance. Additionally, those affected often have a happy personality.

== Epidemiology ==
Although the prevalence of Angelman syndrome is not known, some estimates are available. The best data available are from studies of school-age children (ages 6–13 years) in Sweden and Denmark, in which the diagnosis frequencies of AS among children attending medical clinics were compared with those over an 8-year period with 45,000 births. The Swedish study showed an AS prevalence of about 1 per 20,000, and the Danish study showed a minimum AS prevalence of about 1 per 10,000. AS rates are similar between males and females.

== History ==
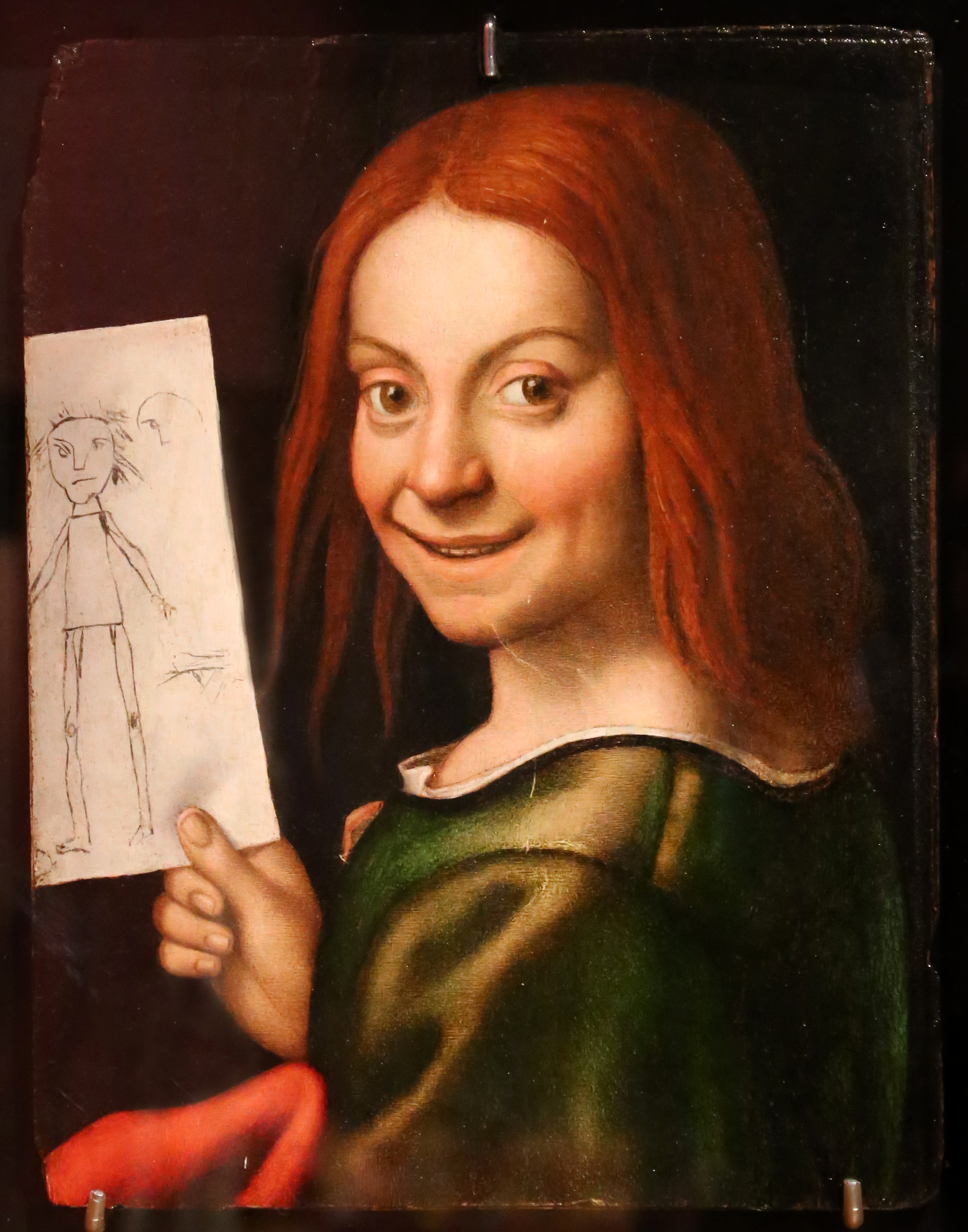
"Boy with a Puppet" or "A child with a drawing", c. 1520, by Giovanni Francesco Caroto; the portrait motivated the initial naming of Angelman syndrome as puppet syndrome.

Harry Angelman, a pediatrician working in Warrington, England, first reported three children with this condition in 1965. Angelman later described his choice of the title "Puppet Children" to describe these cases as being related to an oil painting he had seen while vacationing in Italy:

The history of medicine is full of interesting stories about the discovery of illnesses. The saga of Angelman's syndrome is one such story. It was purely by chance that nearly thirty years ago (e.g. [sic], circa 1964) three handicapped children were admitted at various times to my children's ward in England. They had a variety of disabilities and although at first sight they seemed to be suffering from different conditions I felt that there was a common cause for their illness. The diagnosis was purely a clinical one because in spite of technical investigations which today are more refined I was unable to establish scientific proof that the three children all had the same handicap. In view of this I hesitated to write about them in the medical journals. However, when on holiday in Italy I happened to see an oil painting in the Castelvecchio Museum in Verona called ... a Boy with a Puppet. The boy's laughing face and the fact that my patients exhibited jerky movements gave me the idea of writing an article about the three children with a title of Puppet Children. It was not a name that pleased all parents but it served as a means of combining the three little patients into a single group. Later the name was changed to Angelman syndrome. This article was published in 1965 and after some initial interest lay almost forgotten until the early eighties.

— Angelman quoted by Charles Williams

Case reports from the United States first began appearing in the medical literature in the early 1980s. Specifically, in 1982, Dr. Charles Williams and Dr. Jaime Frias saw their first patients they believed had "happy puppet syndrome". In 1987, Ellen Magenis, a physician, discovered a genetic marker of AS. Specifically, it was noted that around half of the children with AS have a small piece of chromosome 15 missing. In 1992, the AS foundation was created to further research for treatments and a cure for Angelman syndrome. In 1997, Dr. Arthur Beaudet discovered the cause of AS was the mutation of the UBE3A gene.

== Signs and symptoms ==
=== Consistent ===
100% of AS diagnoses have the following symptoms:

- developmental delay: considered to be functionally severe; includes the inability for infants to support their heads and pull themselves up to stand, and feeding issues due to problems with sucking and/or swallowing;
- speech impairment: no or minimal use of words, and use of receptive and non-verbal communication, such as cooing or babbling;
- movement or balance disorder: movement dysfunction can range on a spectrum of mild to more severe movement disorders, such as ataxia; typically, AS cases present ataxia or gait and/or tremulous movement of limbs;
- behavioral characteristics: broader category including any combination of atypical frequent laughter/smiling; atypically happy demeanor; easily excitable personality, often with hand flapping movements; hypermotoric behavior; short attention span.

=== Frequent ===
Roughly 80% of AS diagnoses have the following symptoms:

- microcephaly: delayed, disproportionate growth in head circumference, with (absolute or relative) microcephaly by age 2;
- seizures: onset usually occurs under age 3;
- abnormal EEG: characteristic pattern with large amplitude slow-spike waves

=== Associated ===
Roughly 20–80% of AS diagnoses are made in the setting of the following symptoms:

- strabismus;
- hypopigmentation of skin and eyes;
- tongue thrusting;
- suck and/or swallowing disorders;
- hyperactive tendon reflexes;
- feeding problems during infancy;
- uplifted, flexed arms while walking;
- prominent mandible;
- increased sensitivity to heat;
- wide mouth, wide-spaced teeth;
- sleep disturbance, total sleep time is decreased due to nighttime waking;
- frequent drooling, protruding tongue;
- attraction to/fascination with water;
- excessive chewing/mouthing behaviors;
- flat back of the head;
- smooth palms;
- gastroesophageal reflux disease (GERD);
- constipation

Diagnostic criteria for the disorder were initially established in 1995 in collaboration with the Angelman Syndrome Foundation, based in the US; those criteria underwent revision in 2005.

== Cause ==
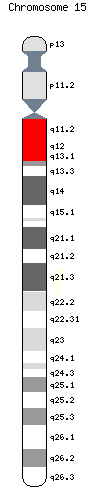
Chromosome 15

Angelman syndrome is caused by mutations in the UBE3A gene. This gene is located within a region of chromosome 15 known as 15q11-q13. UBE3A is implicated in the ubiquitin pathway, which tags proteins to be degraded by a proteasome. Specifically, UBE3A codes for a very selective E6-AP ubiquitin ligase which targets MAPK1, PRMT5, CDK1, CDK4, β-catenin, and UBXD8 for ubiquitination. Alternative splicing of UBE3A results in three isoforms or variants of UBE3A with varying N-terminus.

Typically, a fetus inherits a maternal copy of UBE3A and a paternal copy of UBE3A. In certain areas of the developing brain, the paternal copy of UBE3A is inactivated through a process known as imprinting, and the fetus relies solely on the functioning maternal copy of UBE3A in order to develop normally. In an individual with AS, the maternal UBE3A copy is absent or not functioning normally, which negatively affects fetal brain development. There are four main maternal UBE3A geneotypes which make up a majority of the AS cases, which are listed below.

Deletion Positive (70% of AS cases): The most common genetic defect leading to Angelman syndrome is a 5- to 7-Mb (megabase) maternal deletion in chromosomal region 15q11.2-q13. Essentially, the maternal copy of the UBE3A allele is completely deleted, and only the paternal copy of the UBE3A gene is present.

Mutation (11% of AS cases): This genotype of AS entails a mutation of the maternal UBE3A which prevents the expression of maternal UBE3A or alters its function.

Imprinting Center Defect (6% of AS cases): Individuals with an imprinting center defect have an abnormality in the imprinting center of the maternal copy of the UBE3A gene. The imprinting center is an area on the chromosome that regulates whether genes are turned on or turned off. Therefore, the maternal copy of the UBE3A gene may be present in an individual with AS; however, if the AS patient has an imprinting center defect the maternal UBE3A gene is unavailable in the brain.

Paternal Uniparental Disomy (UPD) (3% of AS cases): This genotype occurs when there are two paternal copies of UBE3A and no maternal copy. Since the paternal copy of UBE3A is silent in the brain and the maternal copy is still absent, this genotype is still problematic for CNS development.

Importantly, the genotypes are predictive of the severity of symptoms. For example, the most common genotype of AS, deletion positive, is associated with more severe symptoms such as microcephaly, seizures, hypopigmentation, less weight gain, while the more rare genetic causes of AS, paternal uniparental disomy is associated with less severe symptoms.

== Diagnosis ==
The presence of the consistent features of AS is required for the diagnosis of AS. However, additional genetic testing can be performed to confirm a proper diagnosis of AS.

Methylation studies: In 80% of AS patients, the maternal copy of UBE3A is methylated. Therefore, methylation studies can be done to confirm AS in patients.

Fluorescence in situ hybridization (FISH): is conducted following methylation studies to detect if there is a maternal deletion of UBE3A on chromosome 15

DNA marker analysis: Imprinting defects or paternal disomy must also be considered using other molecular tests or DNA marker analysis, respectively. Myethylation studies can miss a mutation of UBE3A. Therefore, DNA sequencing can be done.

Electroencephalograms: Lastly, electroencephalograms can indicate characteristic patterns of AS brain activity and also reveal epileptic activity, a common symptom in AS.

=== Differential diagnosis ===
Other conditions that can appear similar include:

- Autism spectrum; Angelman syndrome involves genes that have also been linked to 1–2% of autism spectrum disorder cases.
- Cerebral palsy;
- Rett syndrome;
- Mowat–Wilson syndrome;
- Adenylosuccinate lyase deficiency;
- Pitt–Hopkins syndrome;
- Phelan–McDermid syndrome;
- Skraban–Deardorff syndrome;
- Prader–Willi syndrome (PWS): Region 15q11-13 is implicated in both Angelman syndrome and PWS. While AS results from mutation, loss or abnormal imprinting involving the UBE3A gene within this region on the maternal chromosome, loss of a different cluster of genes within the same region on the paternal chromosome causes PWS.

== Treatment ==
Melatonin

There is currently no approved cure available. The epilepsy can be controlled by the use of one or more types of anticonvulsant medications. However, there are difficulties in ascertaining the levels and types of anticonvulsant medications needed to establish control, because people with AS often have multiple types of seizures. Many families use melatonin to promote sleep in a condition which often affects sleep patterns. Mild laxatives are also used frequently to encourage regular bowel movements. Additionally, among a cohort of 163 individuals with AS, ranitidine was shown to be the most frequently prescribed medication for treating gastroesophageal reflux disease (GERD). Early intervention with physiotherapy is sometimes used to encourage joint mobility and prevent stiffening of the joints.

Occupational therapists can contribute to the development and enhancement of non-verbal communication skills by addressing foundational skills such as finger isolation, motor planning, hand-eye coordination, spatial awareness, and gesture refinement. This is important because individuals with Angelman syndrome who already possess some form of non-verbal communication have a much harder time adapting to changes in a new or existing AAC device because they can communicate their needs much faster nonverbally.

Occupational therapists can assist individuals with Angelman syndrome with many other skills as well. Many individuals with Angelman syndrome also have difficulty processing sensory information and responding appropriately to sensory stimuli. Occupational therapists can work together with these individuals to improve their visual perceptual skills and increase their sensory awareness.

AS limits expressive verbal communication, but many people with the disorder can learn nonverbal communication skills to express their needs. Deictic gesturing (i.e., pointing to an object) is the most commonly used form of non-symbolic communication in AS, followed by physically manipulating others (such as moving a caregiver's hand to a specific object or guiding a person to a new location) and non-speech vocalizations. Some are able to use symbolic communication such as signing, though the prevalence of this ability is related to both genetic etiology and epilepsy status, with non-deletion etiologies without epilepsy showing the highest prevalence of symbolic communication skills. People with AS tend to have much higher receptive language abilities than expressive; recent studies have shown that patients with AS have typical auditory brain region responses to speech but atypical memory responses, suggesting that word meaning recall is delayed or processed differently in AS. This may be caused by the altered cortical morphology seen in AS in the precuneus, a region of the brain involved in self-reflection and memory. Similarly, both adults and children with AS show a delay in processing speed in speech processing, and this should be accounted for during communication.

An experimental treatment, currently in clinical development by Roche, targets the GABAA α5 receptor. Alogabat is a small molecule that acts as a positive allosteric modulator (PAMs) of the receptor. It does not involve replacing or activating the UBE3A gene; instead, it is a mechanism aimed at improving various symptoms of AS, such as learning, sleep, and seizure control.

== Novel therapeutic approaches ==
=== Rodent models ===
Several models have been developed to study the neuropathology of AS, including neuron cultures, animal models, human post-mortem brain tissue samples, and induced pluripotent stem cells from AS patients. The UBE3A maternal-deficient mouse model (UBE3A m-/p+) is one of the most commonly used models to study AS. This genetically modified mouse line is a valuable model for AS, since these mice present multiple symptoms of AS, such as ataxia, seizures, and sleep alterations. However, there are multiple mouse models of AS. Between mouse models, their genetic modification of the UBE3A gene and translatability to clinical AS symptoms vary. Recent advancements have been made to restore UBE3A levels in AS mice by activating the normally silenced paternal UBE3A allele in neurons. The paternal UBE3A allel is inactive in neurons because the UBE3A-ATS RNA transcript silences it. The topoisomerase inhibitor topotecan is effective at unsilencing paternal UBE3A throughout the rodent brain.

=== Porcine model ===
To overcome limitations in rodent models, a porcine one has been developed. This offers several advantages. The pig UBE3A gene shares greater sequence similarity with humans when compared to rodents, even though rodents are phylogenetically closer to humans than pigs. Compared to rodents, the pig brain is more similar to the human brain in developmental trajectory, size, structure, gyrencephalic folding, gene expression, resting-state networks, and white-to-gray matter ratio. Unlike neonatal and juvenile rodents, which are challenging to study due to their small size and altricial development, pigs are precocial. This enables their development to be studied from birth. Their larger size allows for detailed gait analysis. This has revealed a phenotype more akin in severity and similarity to human AL than in rodent models. Notably, they show an ataxic gait of a wide stance and a short, highly variable stride length that closely matches human AS. Moreover, like human AS, they show suckling difficulties and hypotonia from birth, while impaired vocalization mirrors AS communication deficits, offering the opportunity to test potential therapies.

=== Clinical trials ===
Clinical trials are conducted to test the effectiveness of drugs for the treatment of AS. Below are the recent, ongoing, or upcoming clinical trials for AS in order of the clinical phase.

Tangelo (phase 1): Roche is testing the safety of an antisense oligonucleotide, RO7248824, administered via intrathecal injection. This drug works to unsilence paternal UBE3A.

Aldebran (phase 2): Roche is testing the safety of Alogobat, which is administered as a once daily oral tablet. Alogobat targets the GABAA α5 receptor. Alogabat is a small molecule that acts as a positive allosteric modulator (PAM) of the receptor. It does not involve replacing or activating the UBE3A gene. Instead, it is a mechanism aimed at improving various symptoms of AS, such as learning, sleep, and seizure control.

Angelman syndrome Study (phase 2): Neuren Pharmaceuticals is testing the safety of NNZ-2591, an oral medication which has been shown to improve impaired connection and signaling in brain cells.

Aspire (phase 3): Aspire was researching GTX-102, an antisense oligonucleotide that attempts to unsilence the paternal copy of UBE3A. This drug is administered via intrathecal injection. On September 2nd, 2026 the firm announced the clinical was a failure in both the primary and secondary endpoints.

Reveal (phase 3): Ionis is investigating ION582, which is an antisense oligonucleotide designed to increase UBE3A production.

== Neurophysiology ==
In humans with AS, electroencephalogram (EEG) activity appears often abnormal. This EEG facilitates the differential diagnosis of AS, but is not pathognomonic. Three distinct interictal patterns are seen in these patients. The most common pattern is a very large amplitude 2–3 Hz rhythm most prominent in prefrontal leads. The next most common is a symmetrical 4–6 Hz high voltage rhythm. The third pattern, 3–6 Hz activity punctuated by spikes and sharp waves in occipital leads, is associated with eye closure. Paroxysms of laughter have no relation to the EEG, ruling out this feature as a gelastic phenomenon.

EEG anomalies may be used as a quantitative biomarkers to "chart progression of AS and as clinical outcome measures". Slow delta activity (~3 Hz) is greatly increased in AS relative to typically developing children, yet more pronounced in children with partial 15q deletions as opposed to those with etiologies principally affecting UBE3A. Theta activity (~5 Hz) is much greater in children with partial 15q deletions. Thus, delta activity appears to be chiefly reflective of UBE3A dysfunction with some modulation from other 15q genes, whereas theta activity may be an electrophysiological readout of genes beyond UBE3A such as GABRA5, GABRB3, and GABRG3.

=== Brain regions ===
The paternal copy of UBE3A is silenced within the hippocampus, cortex, thalamus, olfactory bulb, and cerebellum. Therefore, a functioning maternal copy of UBE3A is essential for proper development in these brain regions. Of the areas of the brain implicated in AS, the hippocampus, cortex, and cerebellum have been extensively studied. Findings from these three brain regions are outlined below.

Hippocampus: The hippocampus is responsible for learning and memory processes. In AS models, hippocampal cell function is impaired. Specifically, AS models display an increase in the alpha 1 subunit of the sodium potassium pump, the NaV1.6 sodium channel, and the anchoring protein ankyrin-G. Ultimately, these proteins can alter the activity of hippocampal cells and result in dysfunction of synaptic plasticity, and, in return, learning and memory deficits. During normal hippocampal function, UBE3A marks the protein ARC for degradation. Lack of maternal UBE3A leads to ARC accumulation and excessive endocytosis of the excitatory AMPA receptor in hippocampal neuron dendrites. In mice with a UBE3A and ARC knockout, seizure symptoms are reduced. Sleep disturbances are a common symptom of AS, which can have a serious impact on the well-being of individuals with AS. Circadian rhythm, the body's biological clock, influences hippocampal cell function. UBE3A mutation decreases BMAL1, a protein that influences circadian rhythm, and weakens the interaction between mGluR5 and HOMER1A, which are proteins involved in neurotransmission. The changes in BMAL1 and mGluR5 were found to impair the sleep wake cycle and produce sleep deprivation.

Cortex: The cortex is involved in a variety of brain functions. Importantly, cortical impairment is a hallmark of many neuropsychiatric disorders. In the cortex of AS mice, there is an imbalance of cortical activity. Specifically, AS mice display an overexcitable cortex. This increase in cortical brain activity is produced by changes in dendritic spines and synaptic vesicle cycling. Increased cortical activity in AS mice may be responsible for producing seizures, which are a common symptom of AS. Additionally, microRNAs in the cortex of AS mice display impaired function. For example, in AS mice, microRNAs increase intracellular Ca2+, which leads to maladaptive phosphorylation of CaMKII in primary cortical neurons. CamKII plays a primary role in learning and memory. Therefore, dysfunction of CaMKII signalling in the cortex may be responsible for memory deficits present in AS.

Cerebellum: The cerebellum plays a central role in motor function. Therefore, motor impairments in AS may arise from cerebellum dysfunction. In AS mice, granule cells, a major cell type in the cerebellum, display decreased tonic inhibition. Additionally, in granule cells of AS mice, the GABA transporter 1 is upregulated. This results in decreased activation of GABA receptors on granule cells, suggesting granule cell activity is not being properly regulated in AS mice. Reducing granule cell activity in the cerebellum of AS mice decreases ataxia symptoms. Additionally, the mTOR pathway plays a role in AS pathology. Specifically in AS mice, Purkinje cells, which are another main cell type in the cerebellum, have an mTOR1 and mTOR2 imbalance. This imbalance has been shown to produce motor dysfunction.

== Prognosis ==
The severity of the symptoms associated with Angelman syndrome varies significantly across the population of those affected. Some speech and a greater degree of self-care are possible among the least profoundly affected. Walking and the use of simple sign language may be beyond the reach of the more profoundly affected. Early and continued participation in physical, occupational (related to the development of fine-motor control skills), and communication (speech) therapies are believed to significantly improve the prognosis (in the areas of cognition and communication) of individuals affected by AS. Further, the specific genetic mechanism underlying the condition is thought to correlate to the general prognosis of the affected person. On one end of the spectrum, a mutation to the UBE3A gene is thought to correlate to the least affected, whereas larger deletions on chromosome 15 are thought to correspond to the most affected.

The clinical features of Angelman syndrome alter with age. As adulthood approaches, hyperactivity and poor sleep patterns improve. The seizures decrease in frequency and often cease altogether, and the EEG abnormalities are less obvious. Medication is typically advisable to those with seizure disorders. Often overlooked is the contribution of the poor sleep patterns to the frequency and/or severity of the seizures. Medication may be worthwhile to help deal with this issue and improve the prognosis with respect to seizures and sleep. Also noteworthy are the reports that the frequency and severity of seizures temporarily escalate in pubescent Angelman syndrome girls, but do not seem to affect long-term health. The facial features remain recognizable with age, but many adults with AS look remarkably youthful for their age.

Puberty and menstruation begin at around the average age. Sexual development is thought to be unaffected, as evidenced by a single reported case of a 15-year old child with Angelman syndrome conceiving a female infant who also had Angelman syndrome.

The majority of those with AS achieve continence by day and some by night. Angelman syndrome is not a degenerative syndrome; people with AS tend to have good overall health, and thus may improve their living skills with support.

Dressing skills are variable and usually limited to items of clothing without buttons or zippers. Most adults can eat with a knife or spoon and fork and can learn to perform simple household tasks. Particular problems which have arisen in adults are a tendency to obesity (more in females), and worsening of scoliosis if it is present. The affectionate nature may also persist into adult life where it can pose a problem socially, but this problem is not insurmountable. People with Angelman syndrome appear to have a reduced but near-normal life expectancy, dying on average 10 to 15 years earlier than the general population.

== Society and culture ==
Many poems in Richard Price's poetry collections Hand Held (1997), Lucky Day (2005), and Small World (2012) reflect on his daughter, who has Angelman syndrome. In October 2007, actor Colin Farrell publicly announced that his son has Angelman syndrome. In the 2011 Philippine drama series Budoy, the titular character and main protagonist Budoy Maniego (played by Filipino actor Gerald Anderson) is diagnosed with Angelman syndrome. Angie Kim’s 2023 novel Happiness Falls features a character with the dual diagnosis of autism and mosaic Angelman syndrome.

== See also ==
- List of syndromes
- Characteristics of syndromic ASD conditions
- Chromosomal deletion syndrome
- Microdeletion syndrome
