= SMC protein =

SMC proteins represent a large family of ATPases that participate in many aspects of higher-order chromosome organization and dynamics. SMC proteins are widely conserved across bacteria, archaea, and eukaryotes. In eukaryotes, they function as the core ATPase subunits of large protein complexes such as condensin, cohesin, and SMC5/6.

The term SMC derives from a mutant strain of Saccharomyces cerevisiae named smc1 (stability of mini-chromosomes 1), which was identified based on its defect in maintaining the stability of mini-chromosomes. After the gene product of SMC1 was characterized, and homologous proteins were found to be essential for chromosome structure and dynamics in many organisms, the acronym SMC was redefined to stand for "Structural Maintenance of Chromosomes".

== Classification ==
=== Eukaryotic SMCs ===
Eukaryotes have at least six SMC proteins in individual organisms, and they form three distinct heterodimers with specialized functions:

- SMC1-SMC3: A pair of SMC1 and SMC3 constitutes the core subunits of the cohesin complexes involved in sister chromatid cohesion.
- SMC2-SMC4: A pair of SMC2 and SMC4 acts as the core of the condensin complexes implicated in chromosome condensation.
- SMC5-SMC6: A pair of SMC5 and SMC6 functions as part of a yet-to-be-named complex implicated in DNA repair and checkpoint responses.

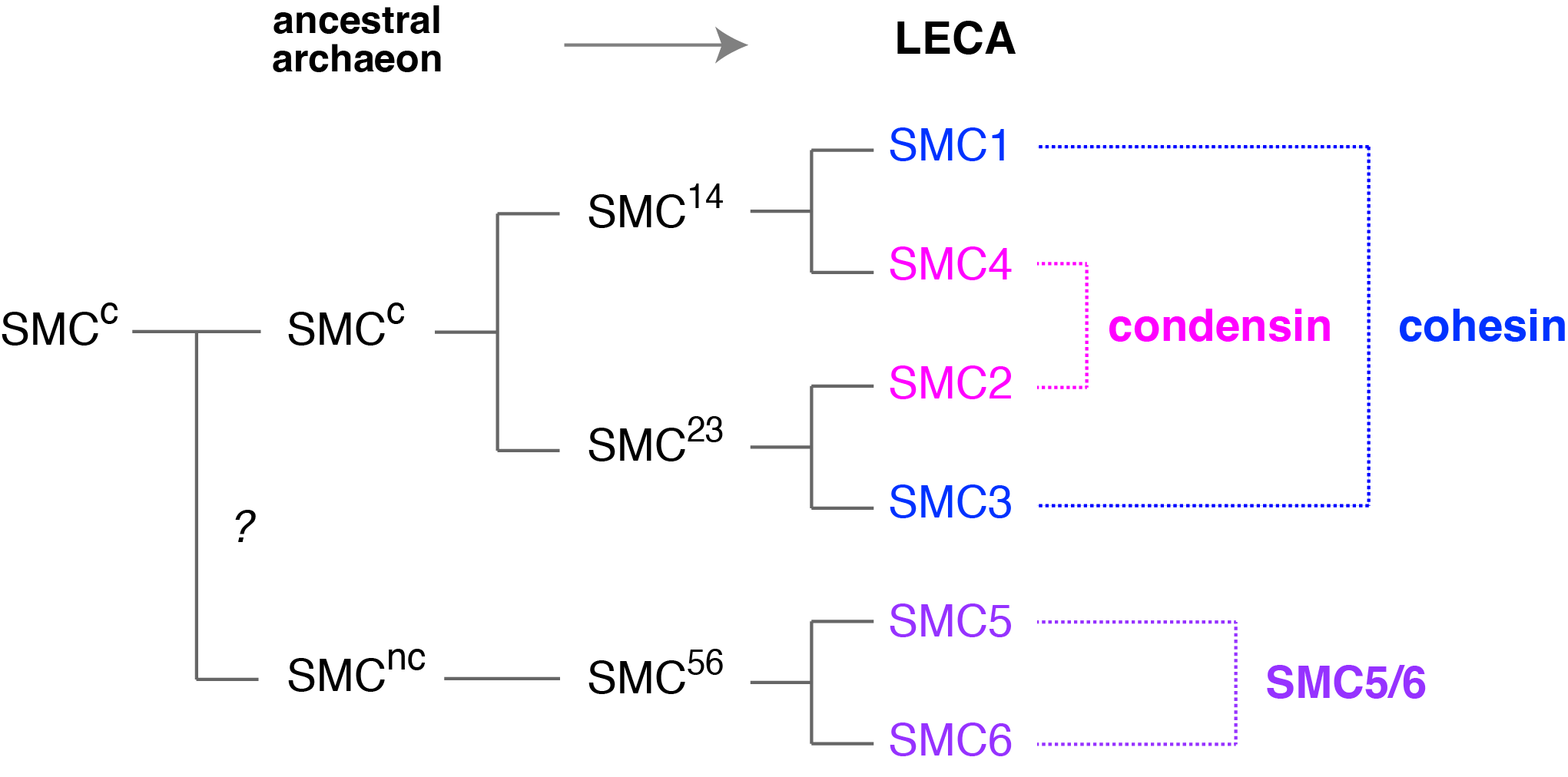
Figure 1. Evolution of SMC proteins: SMC^{c}, canonical SMC; SMC^{nc}, non-canonical SMC; SMC^{14}, ancestor of SMC1 & SMC4; SMC^{23}, ancestor of SMC2 & SMC3; SMC5^{56}, ancestor of SMC5 & SMC6

The pairings of SMC proteins in eukaryotes, SMC1-SMC3, SMC2–SMC4, and SMC5–SMC6, are highly specific and invariant; no exceptions to these combinations have been reported to date. Sequence comparisons reveal that SMC1 and SMC4, as well as SMC2 and SMC3, share a high degree of similarity, while SMC5 and SMC6 form a more distinct clade (Figure 1). It is hypothesized that the last eukaryotic common ancestor (LECA) possessed all six SMC proteins. While SMC1–4 are conserved in all known eukaryotic species, some lineages (such as the ciliate Tetrahymena thermophila) have lost SMC5 and SMC6 during evolution, suggesting that the SMC5/6 complex may not be strictly essential for eukaryotic cell viability.

In addition to the six subtypes, some organisms have variants of SMC proteins. For instance, mammals have a meiosis-specific variant of SMC1, known as SMC1β. The nematode Caenorhabditis elegans has an SMC4-variant that has a specialized role in dosage compensation.

The following table shows the SMC proteins names for several model organisms and vertebrates:

Subfamily	Complex	Vertebrates	D. melanogaster	C. elegans	S. cerevisiae	S. pombe	T. thermophila
SMC1α	cohesin	SMC1α	Smc1	SMC-1	Smc1	Psm1	Smc1
SMC2	condensin	SMC2/CAP-E	Smc2	MIX-1	Smc2	Cut14	Smc2
SMC3	cohesin	SMC3	Smc3	SMC-3	Smc3	Psm3	Smc3
SMC4	condensin	SMC4/CAP-C	Smc4	SMC-4	Smc4	Cut3	Smc4
SMC5	SMC5/6	SMC5	Smc5	SMC-5	Smc5	Smc5	-
SMC6	SMC5/6	SMC6	Smc6	SMC-6	Smc6	Smc6/Rad18	-
SMC1β	cohesin（meiotic）	SMC1β	-	-	-	-	-
SMC4 variant	condensin I^{DC}	-	-	DPY-27	-	-	-

=== Prokaryotic SMCs ===
The evolutionary origin of SMC proteins is ancient, and homologs are widely conserved in both bacteria and archaea.

- SMC (canonical type): Many bacteria (e.g., Bacillus subtilis) and archaea possess canonical SMC proteins that closely resemble their eukaryotic counterparts. These bacterial and archaeal SMCs form homodimers and associate with regulatory subunits to form condensin-like complexes, SMC-ScpAB. It is hypothesized that the eukaryotic ancestor (most likely the Asgard archaeon) possessed two types of SMC proteins: a canonical SMC (SMC^{c}) and a non-canonical SMC (SMC^{nc}). Gene duplications of these two ancestral types are thought to have given rise to the six SMC subfamilies present in the last eukaryotic common ancestor (LECA): SMC1–4 evolved from the canonical lineage, while SMC5 and SMC6 evolved from the non-canonical lineage (Figure 1).
- MukB: In some γ-proteobacteria, including Escherichia coli, SMC function is carried out by a distantly related protein called MukB. MukB also forms homodimers and, together with regulatory subunits, assembles into a MukBEF complex, which performs condensin-like functions in organizing bacterial chromosomes.
- MksB/JetC/EptC: A third type of prokaryotic SMC protein, known as MksB, has been identified in certain bacterial species. Like MukB, MksB forms a distantly-related condensin-like complex, MksBEF. More recently, a variant complex called MksBEFG, which includes a nuclease subunit MksG, has been shown to function in plasmid defense. In other bacterial lineages, orthologous systems have been identified, including JetABCD and EptABCD. These systems are collectively referred to as the Wadjet family of SMC-like complexes.

=== SMC-related proteins ===
In a broader sense, several proteins with structural similarities to SMC are considered members of the SMC superfamily.

- In eukaryotes, Rad50 is a well-known SMC-related protein involved in the repair of DNA double-strand breaks.
- In bacteria, several proteins related to DNA repair also belong to the extended SMC family, including SbcC, RecF, and RecN.
- In archaea, a subfamily known as Archaea-specific SMC-related proteins (ASRPs) has been identified. Previously described archaeal proteins such as Sph1/2 and ClsN (also known as coalescin) are now considered members of this ASRP subfamily.

== Subunit composition of SMC protein complexes ==
The subunit composition of SMC protein complexes varies across domains of life. The table below and Figures 2 & 3 summarize the representative complexes found in eukaryotes and prokaryotes.

Subunit type	cohesin	condensin I	condensin II	SMC5/6	SMC-ScpAB	MukBEF	JetABCD
ν-SMC	SMC3	SMC2	SMC2	SMC5	SMC	MukB	JetC
κ-SMC	SMC1	SMC4	SMC4	SMC6	SMC	MukB	JetC
kleisin	RAD21	CAP-H	CAP-H2	Nse4	ScpA	MukF	JetA
HEAT-A	NIPBL/Pds5	CAP-D2	CAP-D3	-	-	-	-
HEAT-B	STAG1/2	CAP-G	CAP-G2	-	-	-	-
kite-A	-	-	-	Nse1	ScpB	MukE	JetB
kite-B	-	-	-	Nse3	ScpB	MukE	JetB
SUMO ligase	-	-	-	Nse2	-	-	-
nuclease	-	-	-	-	-	-	JetD

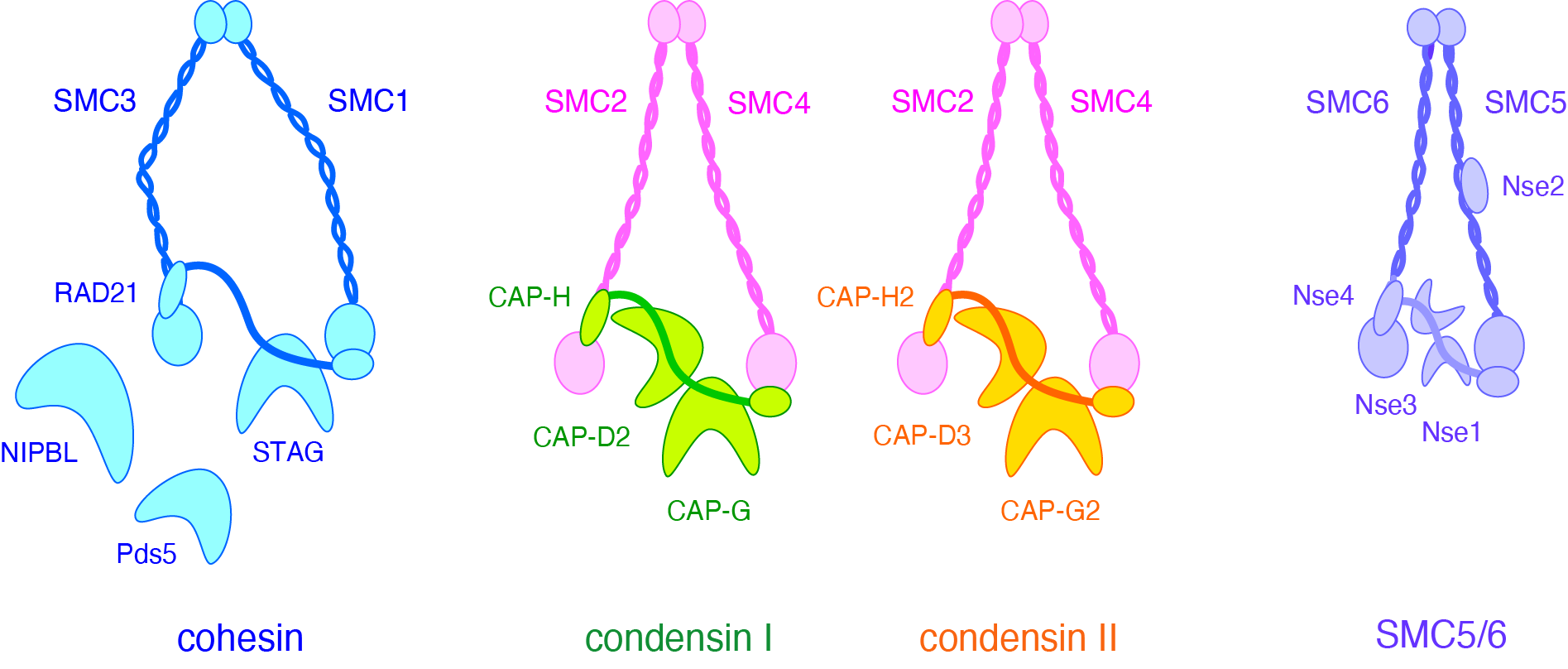
Figure 2. Eukaryotic SMC complexes

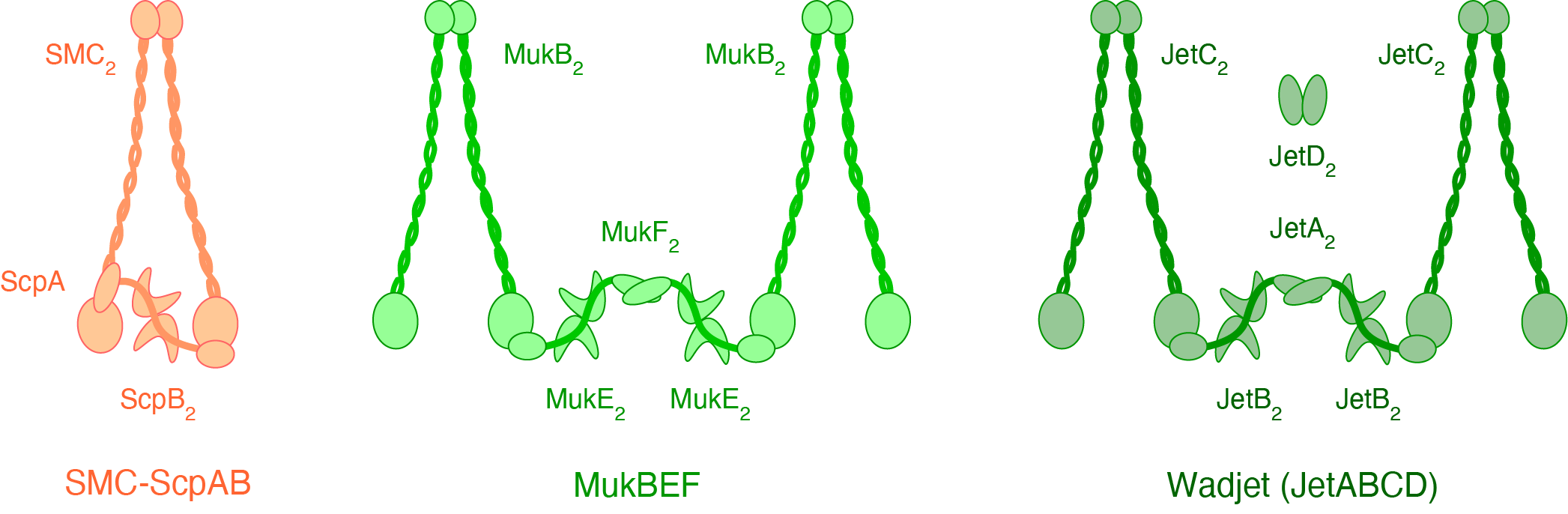
Figure 3. Prokaryotic SMC complexes

All SMC dimers, whether of eukaryotic or prokaryotic origin, associate with a kleisin subunit. In condensins and cohesin, the kleisin subunit is further associated with a pair of HEAT-repeat subunits. Notably, the eukaryotic SMC5/6 complex contains "kite" (kleisin interacting tandem winged-helix elements) subunits instead of HEAT-repeat subunits, making it structurally more similar to prokaryotic complexes such as SMC–ScpAB, MukBEF, and MksBEF. However, unlike their typically homodimeric prokaryotic counterparts, both the SMC and kite subunits in the SMC5/6 complex are heterodimeric, resulting in a more elaborate subunit architecture. The SMC5/6 complex and the Wadjet complex (JetABCD) each possess an additional catalytic subunit: the SUMO ligase Nse2 in SMC5/6, and the nuclease JetD in JetABCD.

== Molecular structure ==
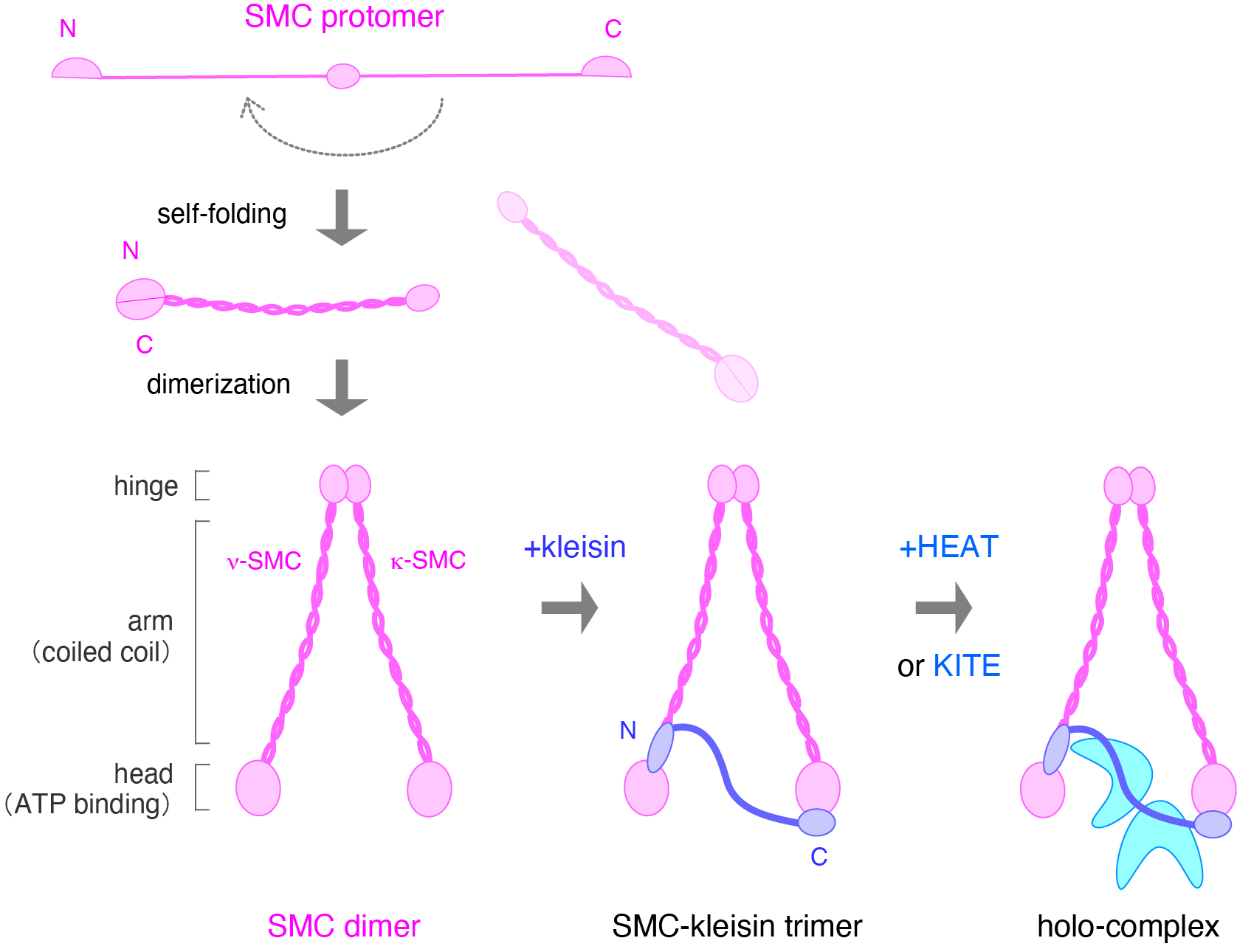
Figure 4. Basic structure of an SMC protein complex

=== Primary structure ===
SMC proteins are 1,000-1,500 amino-acid long. They have a modular structure that is composed of the following domains:

- Walker A ATP-binding motif
- coiled-coil region I
- hinge region
- coiled-coil region II
- Walker B ATP-binding motif; signature motif

=== Secondary and tertiary structure ===
SMC dimers form a V-shaped molecule with two long coiled-coil arms (Figure 4). To make such a unique structure, an SMC protomer is self-folded through anti-parallel coiled-coil interactions, forming a rod-shaped molecule. At one end of the molecule, the N-terminal and C-terminal domains form an ATP-binding domain. The other end is called a hinge domain. Two protomers then dimerize through their hinge domains and assemble a V-shaped dimer. The length of the coiled-coil arms is ~50 nm long. Such long "antiparallel" coiled coils are very rare and found only among SMC proteins (and their relatives such as Rad50). The ATP-binding domain of SMC proteins is structurally related to that of ABC transporters, a large family of transmembrane proteins that actively transport small molecules across cellular membranes. It is thought that the cycle of ATP binding and hydrolysis modulates the cycle of closing and opening of the V-shaped molecule. Still, the detailed mechanisms of action of SMC proteins remain to be determined.

=== Holo-complex assembly ===
The formation of an SMC protein complex involves the association of an SMC dimer with non-SMC subunits (Figure 4). First, the N-terminal domain of the kleisin subunit binds to the neck region (a segment of the coiled coil near the head domain) of one SMC protein, while its C-terminal domain binds to the cap region (part of the head domain) of the other SMC subunit. These interactions result in the formation of a ring-like architecture. As a consequence, the SMC–kleisin trimer adopts an asymmetric configuration. Accordingly, the SMC subunit bound at the N-terminal domain of the kleisin is sometimes referred to as the ν-SMC, while the one bound at the C-terminal domain is called the κ-SMC. Finally, two HEAT-repeat subunits (or two KITE subunits depending on the complex) associate with the central region of the kleisin, completing the assembly of the holo-complex. MukBEF and JetABC form higher-order assemblies through dimerization mediated by their kleisin subunits, a configuration often referred to as a "dimer-of-dimers" (Figure 3).

== Molecular activities ==
SMC protein complexes are involved in a wide range of chromosome-related functions, and each complex is thought to possess distinct molecular activities tailored to its specific role. At the same time, based on their evolutionary origins and conserved structural features, it has been suggested that certain molecular activities may be shared across multiple SMC complexes.

For example, several SMC complexes are known to exhibit DNA entrapment activity, in which DNA is topologically entrapped within the ring-like structure formed by their long coiled-coil arms. This activity has been demonstrated in cohesin, condensin, and the SMC5/6 complex.

More recent studies have highlighted DNA loop extrusion as a conserved molecular activity shared by many SMC protein complexes. Single-molecule analyses have demonstrated that condensin, cohesin, the SMC5/6 complex, and Wadjet are capable of extruding DNA loops in an ATP-dependent manner. During loop extrusion, the ATPase cycle of the SMC subunits is thought to be coupled with dynamic and multivalent interactions between various subunits and DNA. These interactions likely occur in multiple modes, making the molecular mechanism of loop extrusion highly complex and still incompletely understood.

== Genetic Disorders ==
Several genetic disorders have been linked to mutations in genes encoding components or regulators of SMC protein complexes:

- Cohesin-related disorders
  - Cornelia de Lange syndrome: caused by mutations in NIPBL, SMC1A or SMC3.
  - Roberts syndrome: caused by mutations in ESCO2, a gene encoding a cohesin acetyltransferase.
  - Aneuploidy in cancer cells: frequently associated with mutations in STAG2.
- Condensin-related disorders
  - Microcephaly: linked to mutations in CAP-D2, CAP-H, or CAP-D3.
- SMC5/6-related disorders
  - Primordial dwarfism: associated with mutations in NSE2.
  - Severe lung disease: linked to mutations in NSE3.
  - Atelís syndrome: caused by mutations in SMC5.

== International SMC meetings ==
Active research on SMC proteins began in the 1990s. As global interest in this field increased, international meetings dedicated to SMC proteins have been held regularly since the 2010s. These meetings, which are organized approximately every two years, cover a wide range of topics reflecting the diverse functions of SMC protein complexes, from bacterial chromosome segregation to human genetic disorders.

- The 0th International SMC meeting（The 18th IMCB Symposium）"SMC proteins: from molecule to disease", November 29, 2013, Tokyo, Japan.
- The 1st International SMC meeting（EMBO Workshop）"SMC proteins: chromosomal organizers from bacteria to human", May 12-15, 2015, Vienna, Austria.
- The 2nd International SMC meeting "SMC proteins: chromosomal organizers from bacteria to human", June 13-16, 2017, Nanyo, Yamagata, Japan.
- The 3rd International SMC meeting（EMBO Workshop）"Organization of bacterial and eukaryotic genomes by SMC complexes", September 10-13, 2019, Vienna, Austria.
- The 4th International SMC meeting (Biochemical Society of the UK）"Genome Organisation by SMC protein complexes", September 27-30, 2022, Edinburgh, UK.
- The 5th International SMC meeting（NIG & RIKEN International Symposium 2024）"SMC complexes: orchestrating diverse genome functions", October 15-18, 2024, Numazu, Shizuoka, Japan.
- The 6th International SMC meeting（EMBO Workshop）“Threads of life: SMC complexes in chromosome structure and dynamics”, December 13-18, 2026 (scheduled), Bengaluru, India.

== See also ==
- cohesin
- condensin
- Cornelia de Lange Syndrome
