= Chromosome condensation =

Process in mitosis and meiosis

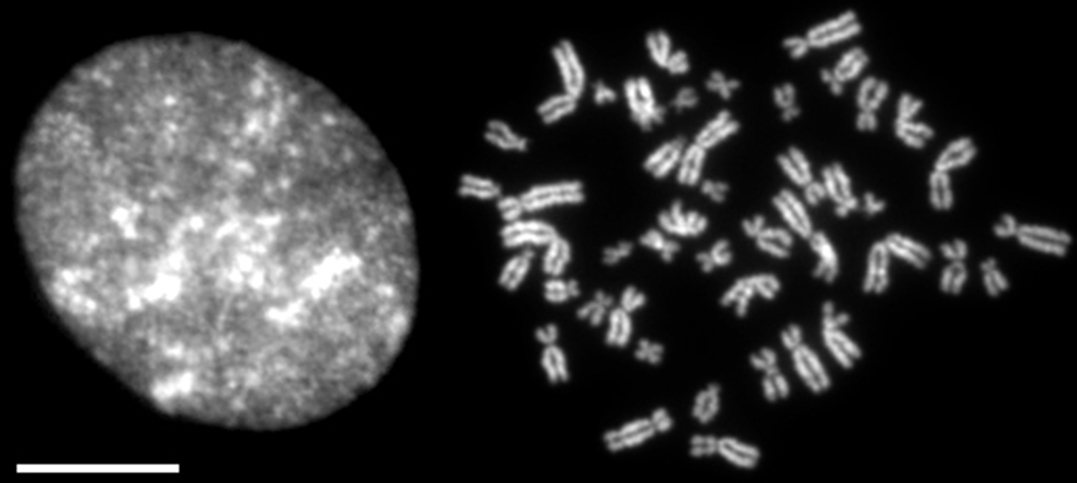
Figure 1 Interphase nucleus and mitotic chromosomes in human cells. Bar, 10 μm

Chromosome condensation refers to the process by which dispersed interphase chromatin is transformed into a set of compact, rod-shaped structures during mitosis and meiosis (Figure 1).

The term "chromosome condensation" has long been used in biology. However, it is now increasingly recognized that mitotic chromosome formation proceeds through mechanisms distinct from those underlying "condensation" in physical chemistry, such as gas-to-liquid phase transitions, and from those underlying the formation of biomolecular condensates in cell biology. Consequently, it has been argued that the term "chromosome condensation" may be misleading in this context. For this reason, alternative terms such as "chromosome assembly" or "chromosome formation" are now also commonly used.

== Processes of chromosome condensation ==
=== From DNA to chromosomes ===
A diploid human cell contains 46 chromosomes: 22 pairs of autosomes (22 × 2) and one pair of sex chromosomes (XX or XY). The total length of DNA within a single nucleus reaches ~2 m. These DNA molecules are initially wrapped around histones to form nucleosomes, which are further compacted into chromatin fibers, commonly referred to as 30-nm fibers. During interphase, these fibers are confined within the nucleus, which has a diameter of only ~10–20 um. During mitosis, chromatin is reorganized into a set of rod-shaped structures (i.e., mitotic chromosomes) that can be individually distinguished under a microscope.

This transformation was first described meticulously in the late 19th century by the German cytologist Walther Flemming. Originally, the term "chromosome" referred specifically to these highly condensed mitotic structures, although its meaning has since broadened (see chromosome).

In mitotic chromosomes of higher eukaryotes, DNA is compacted lengthwise by a factor of ~10,000. For example, human chromosome 8 contains a DNA molecule about 50 mm long, yet it is folded into a metaphase chromosome only ~5 um in length. This degree of compaction is comparable to folding a 600-meter-long thread (the height of the Tokyo Skytree) into the size of an AA battery.

=== Physiological significance of chromosome condensation ===
As described above, although DNA in interphase is already organized into chromatin, it is dispersed throughout the nucleus and therefore not observed as individual chromosomes. Upon entry into prophase, condensation begins near the nuclear periphery, and fibrous structures gradually become visible. After nuclear envelope breakdown in prometaphase, condensation proceeds further. By metaphase, when condensation is apparently complete, the two sister chromatids of each chromosome can be clearly distinguished. This entire sequence of processes is often collectively referred to as chromosome condensation; however, due to our currently limited understanding of the higher-order structure of chromosomes, the precise definition of this term remains ambiguous.

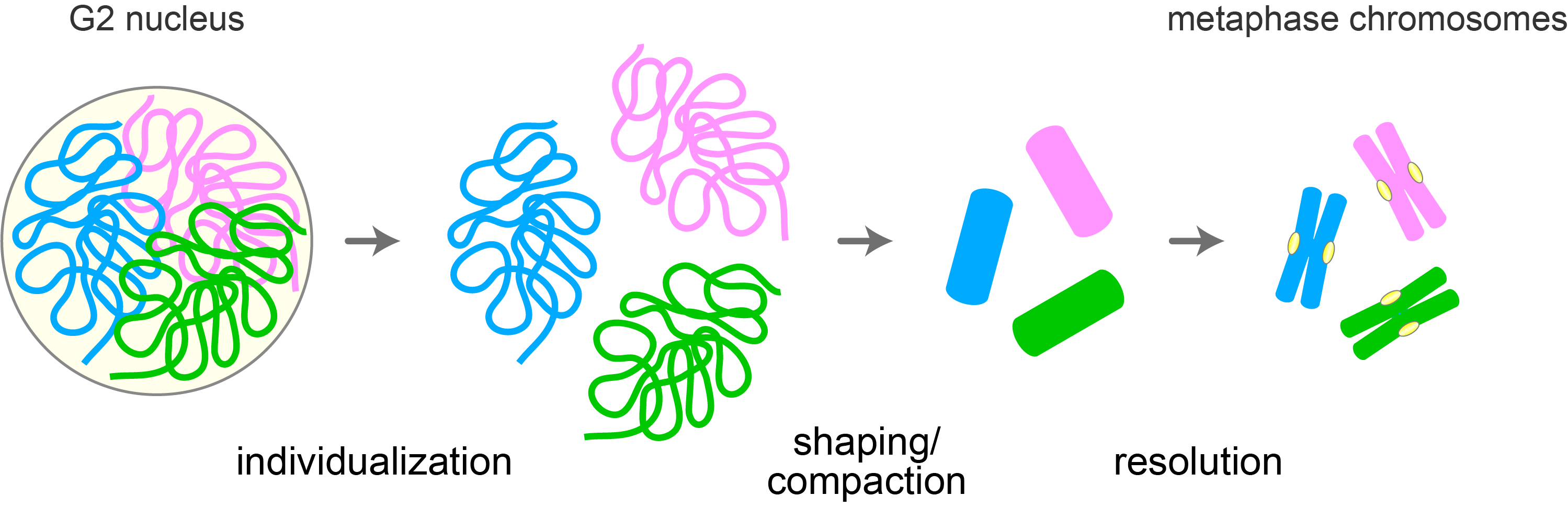
Figure 2. Steps of chromosome condensation

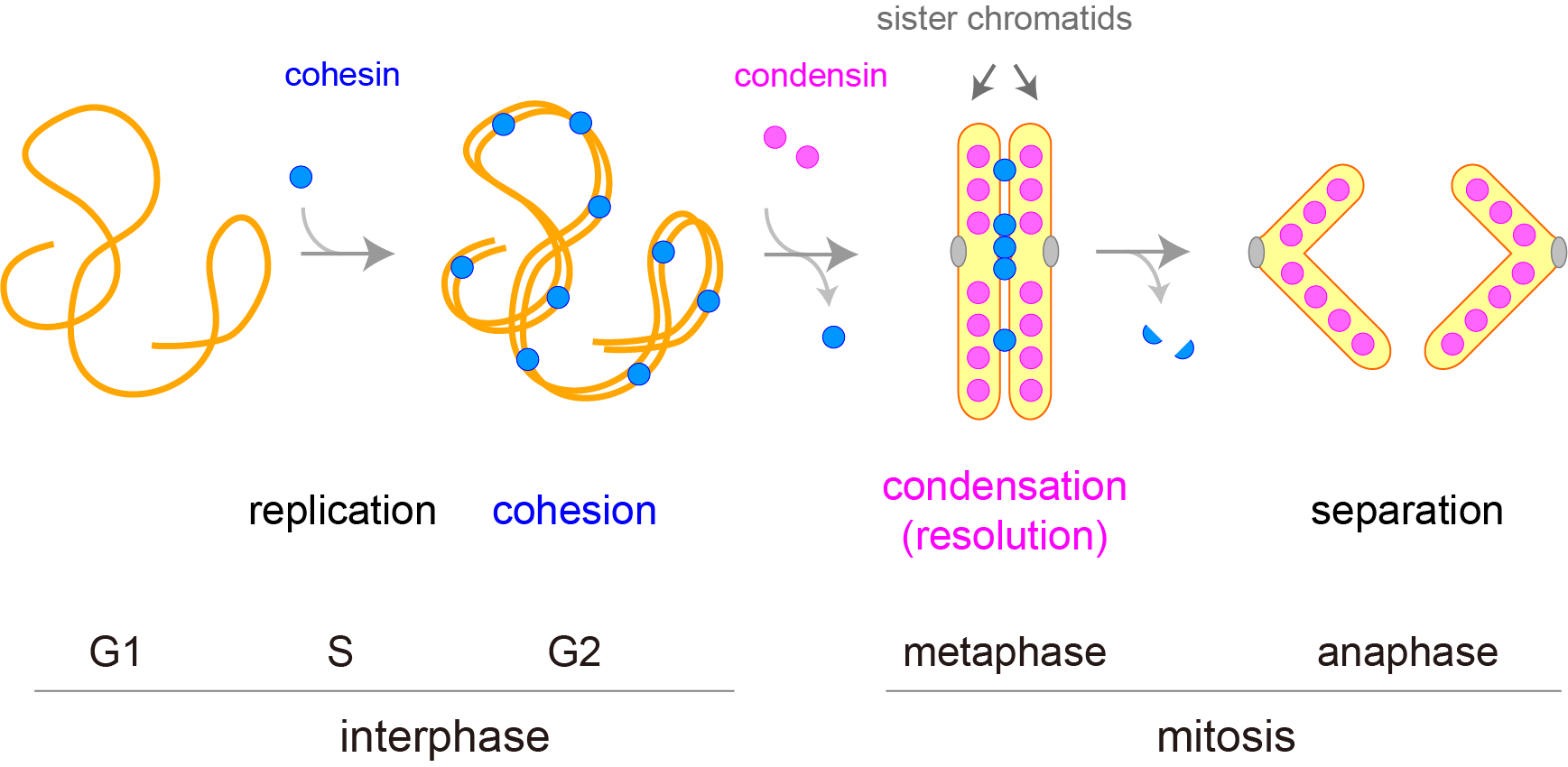
Figure 3. Eukaryotic chromosome segregation

In principle, the process of chromosome condensation can be divided into three sequential but overlapping steps (Figure 2):

1. Individualization – Disentanglement of chromatin fibers dispersed throughout the nucleus into discrete chromosome units.

2. Shaping/Compaction – Organization of each chromosome into a compact, rod-like structure.

3. Resolution – Resolution of replicated DNA strands within each chromosome into two distinct sister chromatids.

Although conceptually distinct, these steps occur concurrently and synergistically during mitosis. For this reason, the entire process is often collectively referred to as chromosome condensation. Importantly, chromosome condensation is not merely a reduction in chromatin length. Rather, it involves the organized folding of chromatin, initially in a random-coil–like state, into a highly structured rod-shaped form. This structural transformation is critical for ensuring the proper separation of sister chromatids during anaphase and provides the mechanical stiffness necessary for their faithful segregation (Figure 3). Defects in chromosome condensation can impair chromosome segregation and ultimately lead to genome instability.

== Protein factors involved in chromosome condensation ==
=== Identification of essential factors ===
Eukaryotic chromosome condensation has long been regarded as a highly complex process involving numerous proteins. However, recent studies have shown that single chromatids can be reconstituted in vitro by mixing sperm nuclei with only six purified proteins: core histones, three histone chaperones, topoisomerase II, and condensin I. The three histone chaperones serve distinct roles in this reconstitution assay: (1) Npm2 (Nucleoplasmin 2) removes basic sperm-specific proteins from sperm chromatin; (2) Nap1 (Nucleosome assembly protein 1) deposits core histones H2A-H2B onto DNA to form nucleosomes; (3) FACT (Facilitates Chromatin Transcription) dynamically remodels nucleosomes, thereby aiding the actions of topoisomerase II and condensin I. These chaperones do not remain associated with the final product of mitotic chromatids. In other words, the core reactions of mitotic chromosome condensation can be recapitulated using only three structural proteins, core histones, topoisomerase II, and condensin I, provided that their actions are aided by appropriate chaperone-mediated regulation.

Independent lines of previous evidence support this simple picture of chromosome condensation. For example, it has long been known that histones account for approximately half of the total protein mass in mitotic chromosomes. Both topoisomerase II and condensin I have been identified as major structural components of mitotic chromosomes as well as of the so-called chromosome scaffold. Functional assays using Xenopus egg extracts and genetic analyses in fission yeast have demonstrated that both proteins are essential for properly assembling mitotic chromosomes.

=== Condensins ===
Among the three major structural proteins of mitotic chromosomes, condensin was the last to be discovered. However, it is now widely recognized as playing a central role in mitotic chromosome condensation. Most eukaryotes possess two types of condensin complexes, condensin I and condensin II, which partially overlap in function. In some organisms or cell types, condensin I alone is sufficient to support essential mitotic functions. Condensin exhibits ATPase activity and utilizes the energy from ATP hydrolysis to form DNA loops. Among the various models proposed for loop formation, the loop extrusion mechanism attracts much attention. However, an alternative mechanism and higher-order assembly functions have also been suggested.

The spatiotemporal regulation of condensins is tightly coordinated with the progression of the cell cycle. In vertebrate cells, condensin II localizes to the nucleus or chromosomes throughout the cell cycle, whereas condensin I remains in the cytoplasm during interphase. Upon entry into prophase, chromosome condensation is initiated by condensin II. After nuclear envelope breakdown in prometaphase, condensin I gains access to chromosomes, and the two complexes work cooperatively to promote further condensation.

Condensins are subject to various post-translational modifications, among which phosphorylation has been most extensively studied. In vertebrates, Cdk1-mediated phosphorylation is essential for both the DNA supercoiling activity and chromosome assembly activity of condensin I. Experiments using Xenopus egg extracts have shown that phosphorylation of the N-terminal region of the CAP-H subunit relieves its autoinhibitory function, thereby activating the complex. In condensin II, cdk1-dependent phosphorylation of the C-terminal region of the CAP-D3 subunit is similarly involved in releasing inhibitory constraints and promoting its activity.

=== Topoisomerase II ===
Topoisomerase II is an enzyme that controls DNA topology by catalyzing the transient cleavage and re-ligation of double-stranded DNA. Through this activity, topoisomerase II resolves DNA entanglements between sister chromatids or different chromosomes, thereby aiding the action of condensins. Interestingly, recent studies suggest that within individualized chromatids, topoisomerase II may also introduce DNA entanglements, which contribute to morphological shaping and structural stabilization of mitotic chromosomes. Thus, topoisomerase II appears to play a dual role in chromosome architecture: both resolving and introducing DNA entanglements. The C-terminal domain (CTD) of topoisomerase II is required for the latter function. Recently, topoisomerase II has been shown to mediate liquid-liquid phase separation (LLPS) in a DNA- and CTD-dependent manner. These non-enzymatic properties may also contribute to mitotic chromosome condensation.

Topoisomerase II resides in the nucleus during interphase and becomes associated with chromosomes during mitosis. Its chromosomal binding is more dynamic than that of condensins. Although topoisomerase II undergoes various post-translational modifications, it remains unclear whether any of these modifications specifically regulate its activity during mitosis

=== Histones ===
Histones are major structural components of chromatin and chromosomes throughout the cell cycle. It has long been known that core histone H3 and linker histone H1 are phosphorylated specifically during mitosis, suggesting their specific contributions to chromosome condensation. However, direct evidence that these phosphorylations directly induce chromosome condensation remains lacking. In contrast, recent studies have shown that histone deacetylation contributes significantly to mitotic chromosome condensation via phase separation mechanisms.

Remarkably, in Xenopus egg extracts, it is possible to assemble chromosome-like structures even under conditions that inhibit nucleosome formation, provided that condensins and topoisomerase II are present. These "nucleosome-depleted" chromosomes consist of a central axis enriched in condensin and large lateral DNA loops extending from it. This observation suggests that condensins play a central role in shaping the mitotic chromosome, while nucleosomes contribute to the compaction of DNA loops around the axis.

=== Other Regulatory Factors ===
In vertebrate cells, in addition to post-translational modifications, several extrinsic regulatory factors have been identified that modulate condensin function and mitotic chromosome architecture.

- The chromokinesin KIF4A acts as a positive regulator of condensin I, regulating its activity and proper chromosome organization during mitosis.
- The microcephaly-associated protein MCPH1 functions as a negative regulator of condensin II, and mutations in this protein are associated with abnormal chromosome condensation.
- M18BP1, a subunit of the Mis18 complex involved in the deposition of CENP-A at centromeres, acts as a positive regulator of condensin II by competing with MCPH1.
- The nucleolar protein Ki-67 coats the chromosome surface during mitosis and plays an important role in securing chromosome individualization.

In addition to protein regulators, the ionic environment is known to significantly affect the morphology and physical properties of mitotic chromosomes.

== Models of mitotic chromosomes and emerging experimental approaches ==
How chromatin fibers are folded within mitotic chromosomes remains an unsolved question in cell biology. Several models have been proposed to explain the higher-order architecture of condensed chromosomes. Classical models include the hierarchical folding model and the radial loop model. More recently, additional models such as the polymer model and the hierarchical folding and axial glue model have been introduced.

One of the major reasons for the slow progress in understanding the folding of chromatin fibers within mitotic chromosomes has been the limited availability of experimental tools for their structural analysis. Recently, however, the development of a variety of new technologies has enabled more detailed and multifaceted investigations.

- Hi-C (High-throughput chromosome conformation capture)
  - Cell cycle–dependent changes in human cultured cells and modeling of mitotic chromosomes as polymers
  - Comparison of diploid and polytene chromosomes in Drosophila melanogaster
  - Cell cycle dynamics and condensin-dependent chromatin reorganization in Schizosaccharomyces pombe
  - Comparison of G1 and M phase chromosomes in Saccharomyces cerevisiae and the distinct effects of cohesin and condensin depletion
  - Temporal changes in mitotic chromosomes in chicken DT40 cells
  - Functional interplay between condensin and cohesin complexes in human cultured cells and chicken DT40 cells
- Biochemical reconstitution
  - Functional analysis of chromosomal proteins using Xenopus egg extracts
  - In vitro reconstitution of mitotic chromosomes using purified proteins
- Single-molecule techniques
  - DNA compaction assays using magnetic tweezers and optical tweezers
  - Direct visualization of the motor activity of condensin
  - Direct visualization of loop extrusion by condensin
  - DNA compaction mediated by the interplay between condensin I and topoisomerase II
- Imaging-based approaches
  - Cryo-electron tomography (Cryo-ET) for high-resolution 3D structure
  - Nano-scale 3D DNA tracing to map chromosome architecture
  - FAST CHIMP (Facilitated Segmentation and Tracking of Chromosomes in Mitosis Pipeline) for mitotic chromosome tracking
  - Single-nucleosome imaging to analyze nucleosome dynamics within mitotic chromosomes
- Biophysical manipulation
  - Micromanipulation with glass pipettes to measure mechanical properties of mitotic chromosomes
  - Optical tweezers-based micromanipulation to probe chromosomal elasticity and compaction
- Theoretical modeling and computational simulation
  - Modeling mitotic chromosome assembly through a loop extrusion mechanism
  - Modeling mitotic chromosome assembly through a loop capture mechanism
  - Modeling mitotic chromosome assembly by incorporating condensin–condensin interactions
  - Modeling mitotic chromosome assembly through a bridging-induced attraction mechanism

== Chromosome condensation in prokaryotes ==
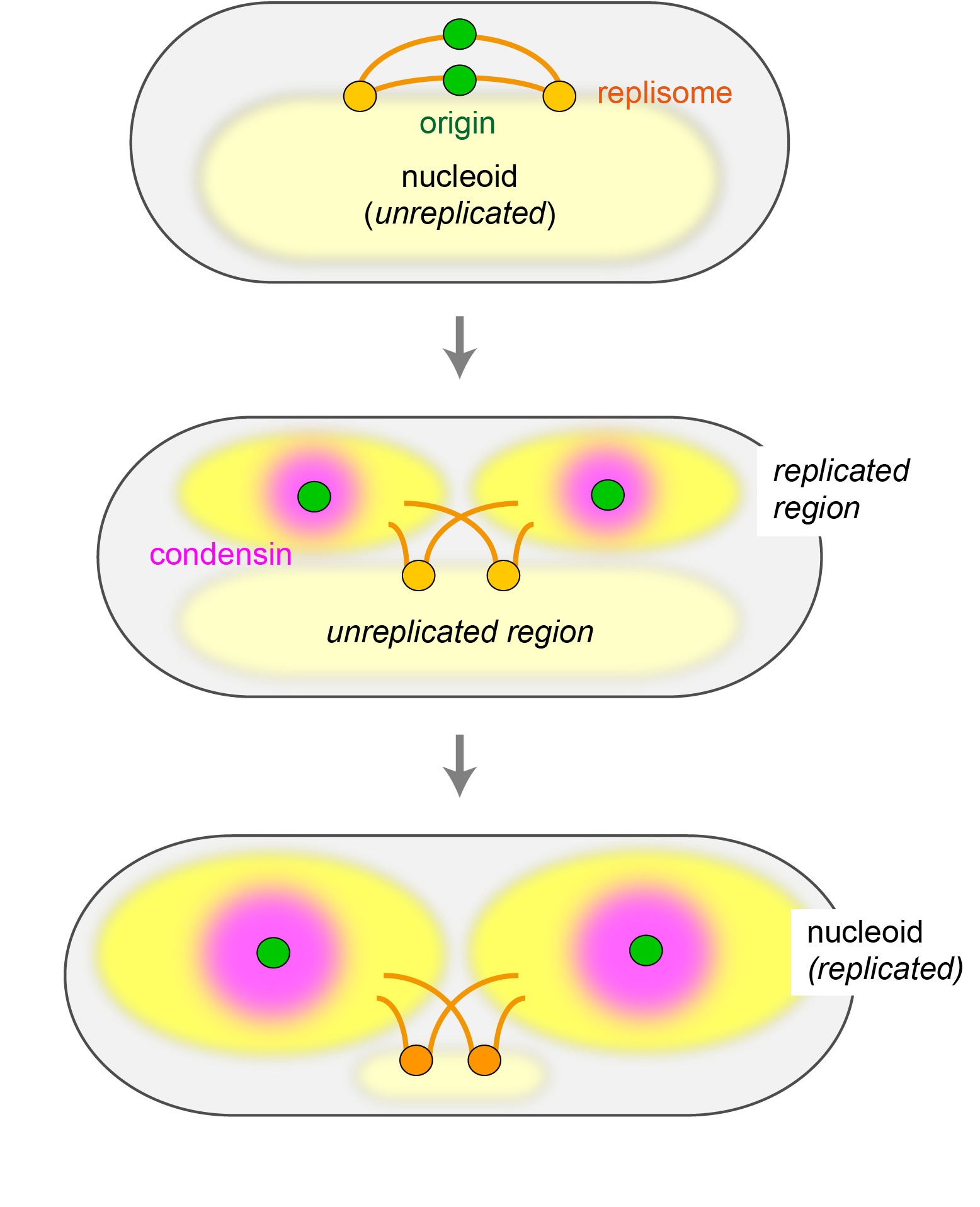
Figure 4. Bacterial chromosome segregation

Although bacteria lack histones, their genomic DNA associates with various nucleoid-associated proteins (NAPs) to form the nucleoid, a functional counterpart of the eukaryotic chromosome.

In bacteria, DNA compaction is facilitated by the introduction of negative supercoils (typically of the plectonemic type) by the enzyme DNA gyrase, a bacterial type II topoisomerase. In contrast, archaea possess histone-like proteins, and in some species, a nucleosome-like particle with ~60 base pair periodicity or an extended polymeric structure have been observed. Recent advances in metagenomics and structure prediction algorithms have led to the discovery and classification of numerous histone-like proteins across prokaryotes.

Many bacterial and archaeal species also possess SMC protein complexes analogous to eukaryotic condensins, including SMC–ScpAB and MukBEF, which play direct roles in organizing the nucleoid structure. Loss-of-function mutations in these complexes cause abnormal nucleoid morphology and defects in chromosome segregation. Thus, prokaryotes undergo a process functionally equivalent to chromosome condensation, which is critical for ensuring proper chromosome segregation within a spatially confined cell volume (Figure 4). Furthermore, Hi-C) technology has been applied to study the dynamics of nucleoid reorganization mediated by bacterial condensin in several model organisms, including Caulobacter crescentus, Bacillus subtilis, and Escherichia coli.

The following table summarizes the similarities and differences in chromosome architecture between eukaryotes and prokaryotes. Such comparisons are crucial for redefining the process of chromosome condensation at the molecular level and for gaining insights into the evolutionary principles underlying higher-order chromosome organization.

	DNA binding protein	local structure	determinant of local structure	determinant of global structure	disentangling enzyme
eukaryotes	histones	left-handed toroidal	nucleosome	condensin	topoisomerase II
prokaryotes	NAPs	negatively supercoiled	DNA gyrase	SMC-ScpAB/MukBEF	topoisomerase IV

== See also ==
- chromosome / nucleoid
- mitosis / meiosis
- DNA / histone / nucleosome / chromatin
- condensin / cohesin / SMC protein / topoisomerase II
- DNA supercoil
