= NCAPH =

Protein-coding gene in the species Homo sapiens

Identifiers
- Aliases: NCAPH, BRRN1, CAP-H, non-SMC condensin I complex subunit H, MCPH23, CAPH
- External IDs: OMIM: 602332; MGI: 2444777; GeneCards: NCAPH

Gene location (Human)
Chr.	Chromosome 2 (human)
Band	2q11.2	Start	96,335,766 bp
Band	2q11.2	End	96,377,091 bp

Gene location (Mouse)
Chr.	Chromosome 2 (mouse)
Band	2|2 F1	Start	126,945,729 bp
Band	2|2 F1	End	126,975,874 bp
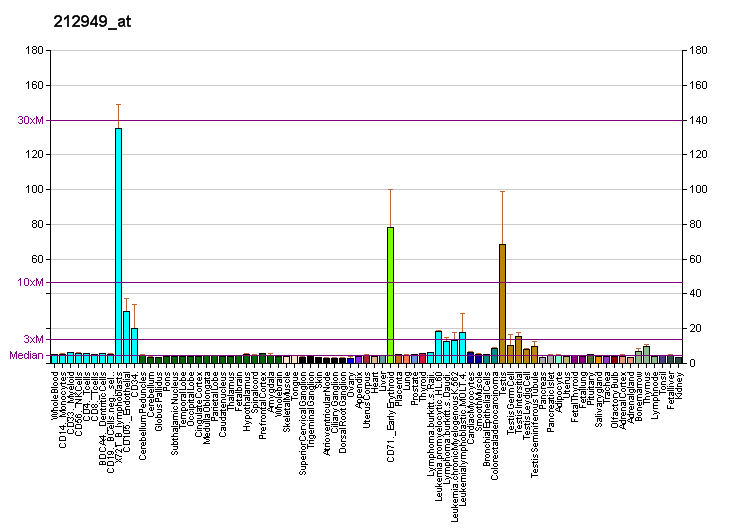
RNA expression pattern
Bgee	Human / Mouse (ortholog); Top expressed in: ventricular zone; ganglionic eminence; gonad; left testis; right testis; testicle; secondary oocyte; sperm; mucosa of transverse colon; rectum / Top expressed in: otic placode; tail of embryo; saccule; genital tubercle; otic vesicle; fetal liver hematopoietic progenitor cell; vas deferens; condyle; fossa; medial ganglionic eminence; More reference expression data
BioGPS	More reference expression data
Gene ontology
Molecular function	protein binding; chromatin binding; DNA topoisomerase binding; DNA topoisomerase type II (double strand cut, ATP-hydrolyzing) activator activity
Cellular component	cytoplasm; membrane; chromosome; condensin complex; nucleus; cytosol
Biological process	cell division; cell cycle; chromosome condensation; mitotic chromosome condensation; meiotic chromosome condensation; meiotic chromosome segregation; positive regulation of DNA topoisomerase (ATP-hydrolyzing) activity; female meiotic nuclear division; female meiosis chromosome separation
Sources:Amigo / QuickGO
Orthologs
Databases	NCBI: entry; OMA: entry
Species	Human	Mouse
Entrez	23397	215387
Ensembl	ENSG00000121152	ENSMUSG00000034906
UniProt	Q15003	Q8C156
RefSeq (mRNA)	NM_001281710; NM_001281711; NM_001281712; NM_015341	NM_144818
RefSeq (protein)	NP_001268639; NP_001268640; NP_001268641; NP_056156	NP_659067
Location (UCSC)	Chr 2: 96.34 – 96.38 Mb	Chr 2: 126.95 – 126.98 Mb
PubMed search
- Wikidata
View/Edit Human	View/Edit Mouse

Condensin complex subunit 2 also known as chromosome-associated protein H (CAP-H) or non-SMC condensin I complex subunit H (NCAPH) is a protein that in humans is encoded by the NCAPH gene. CAP-H is a subunit of condensin I, a large protein complex involved in chromosome condensation. Abnormal expression of NCAPH may be linked to various types of carcinogenesis as a prognostic indicator.

== Function ==
CAP-H is a member of the barr protein family and a regulatory subunit of the condensin complex. This complex is required for the conversion of interphase chromatin into condensed chromosomes. CAP-H is associated with mitotic chromosomes, except during the early phase of chromosome condensation. During interphase, the protein has a distinct punctate nucleolar localization.

== Structure and interactions ==
NCAPH, or CAP-H Joining the terminal ends of the SMC-2 and SMC-4 heterodimer to create the condensin holocomplex.

As one of the main subunits in the highly conserved SMC condensin I complex in eukaryotes, NCAPH associates with NCAPG, NCAPD2, and the N and C termini of the SMC-4 and SMC-2 proteins. NCAPH creates a bridge between the head groups of the SMC proteins and functions as a kleisin protein.

The interaction between NCAPH and the globular ATPase head binding sites of the C terminus and N terminus of the SMC heterodimer allows condensin to have dynamic properties. The C terminus end of NCAPH assumes a winged-helix conformation, which then associates with either head group of the SMC protein. At the opposite end of the kleisin protein, the N terminus associates with proximal coiled coil of the other SMC protein, and creates a helical bundle. This attribute enables the condensin complex to have open and closed conformations in order to associate with chromatin and aid in proper folding of DNA in the condensation process.

Studies suggest that the sub-complex formed between NCAPH and NCAPG is critical for interactions with single-stranded DNA and double-stranded DNA to assist mitotic chromosome assembly in eukaryotes.

== Clinical significance ==
NCAPH may be used as a prognostic indicator of carcinogenesis in humans, as the abnormal over-expression of NCAPH is observed in many cancer types.

Studies show that, in prostate cancer, nasopharyngeal carcinoma, hepatocellular carcinoma, and breast cancers, NCAPH is commonly over-expressed, and may be used as a biomarker for various cancer types and a viable prognostic factor for identification and potential drug targeting.

In colon cancer, NCAPH is shown to be higher expressed in cancerous cells compared to non-cancerous epithelial cells. supplementally, when NCAPH is depleted, studies show a decrease in colon cancer cell proliferation. Studies show that high expression of NCAPH in colon cancer and non-small cell lung cancer patients had an increased survival rate than those with a lower expression of NCAPH.
