= Condensin =

Protein complex

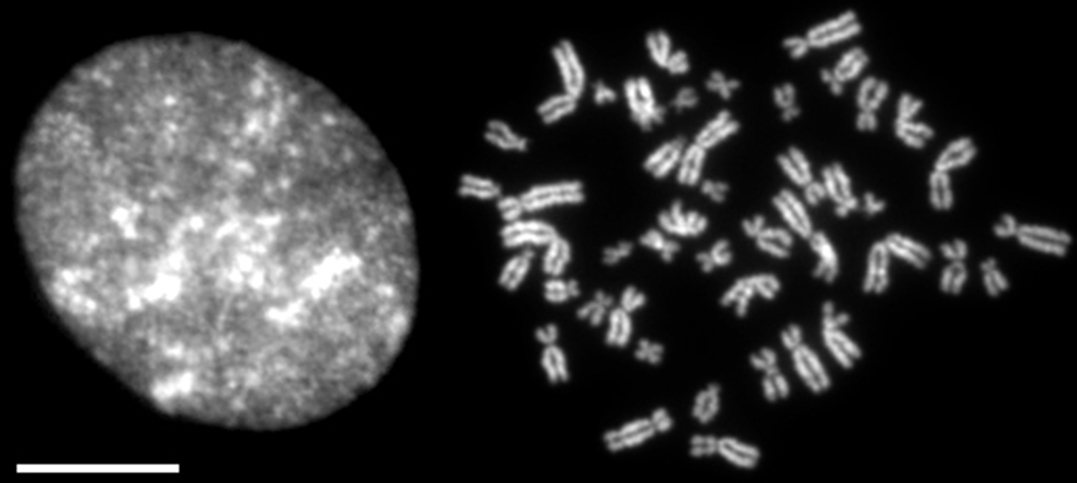
Figure 1. An interphase nucleus (left) and a set of mitotic chromosomes (right) from human tissue culture cells. Bar, 10 μm.

Condensins are large protein complexes that play a central role in chromosome condensation and segregation during mitosis and meiosis (Figure 1). Their subunits were originally identified as major components of mitotic chromosomes assembled in Xenopus egg extracts.

== Subunit composition and phylogeny ==
=== Eukaryotic types ===
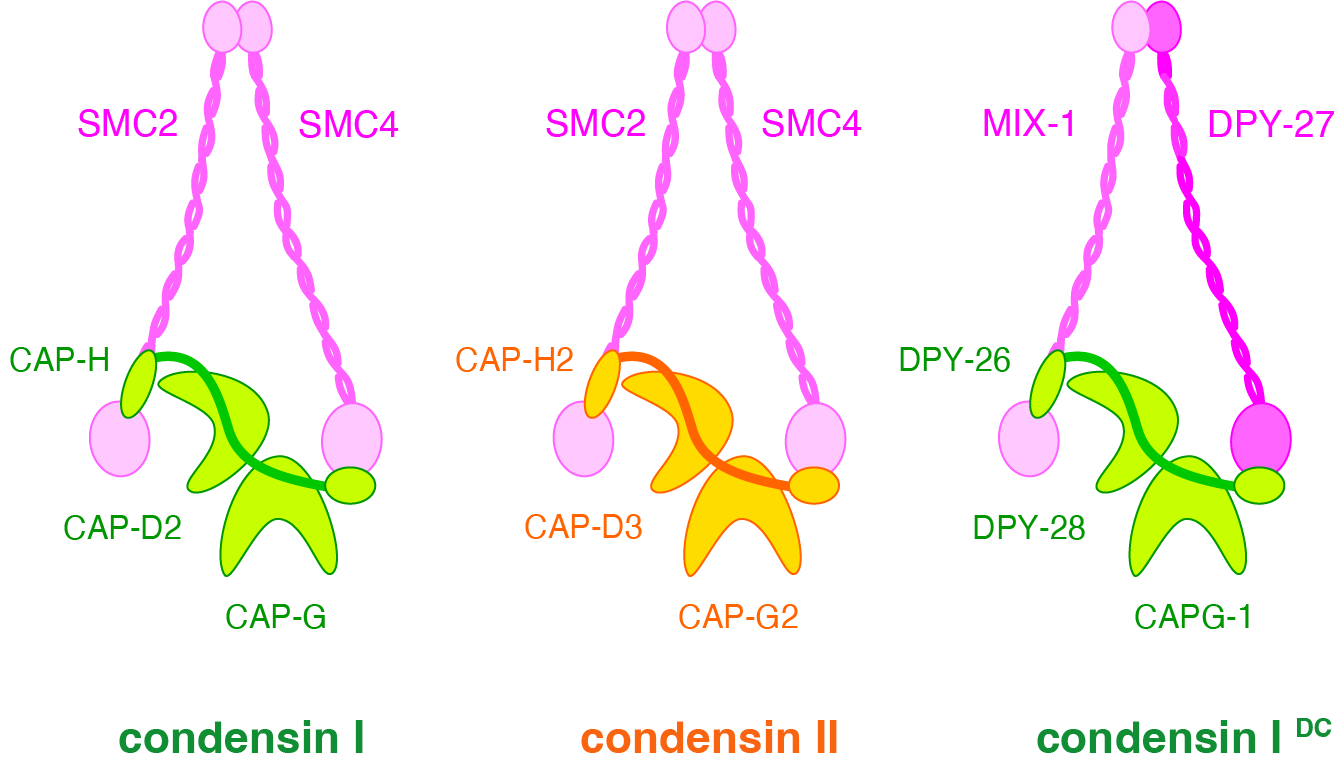
Figure 2. Three eukaryotic condensin complexes

Many eukaryotic cells possess two different types of condensin complexes, known as condensin I and condensin II, each of which is composed of five subunits (Figure 2). Condensins I and II share the same pair of core subunits, SMC2 and SMC4, both belonging to a large family of chromosomal ATPases, known as SMC proteins (SMC stands for Structural Maintenance of Chromosomes). Each of the complexes contains a distinct set of non-SMC regulatory subunits (a kleisin subunit and a pair of HEAT repeat subunits). Both complexes are large, having a total molecular mass of 650-700 kDa.

The core subunits condensins (SMC2 and SMC4) are conserved among all eukaryotic species that have been studied to date. The non-SMC subunits unique to condensin I are also conserved among eukaryotes, but the occurrence of the non-SMC subunits unique to condensin II is highly variable among species.

- For instance, the fruit fly Drosophila melanogaster does not have the gene for the CAP-G2 subunit of condensin II. Other insect species often lack the genes for the CAP-D3 and/or CAP-H subunits, too, indicating that the non-SMC subunits unique to condensin II have been under high selection pressure during insect evolution.
- The nematode Caenorhabditis elegans possesses both condensins I and II. This species is, however, unique in the sense that it has a third complex (closely related to condensin I) that participates in chromosome-wide gene regulation, i.e., dosage compensation. In this complex, known as condensin I^{DC}, the authentic SMC4 subunit is replaced with its variant, DPY-27 (Figure 2). Furthermore, in this organism, condensin I appears to play a role in interphase chromosome organization that is functionally analogous to that of cohesin in vertebrates.
- Some species, like fungi (e.g., the budding yeast Saccharomyces cerevisiae and the fission yeast Schizosaccharomyces pombe), lack all regulatory subunits unique to condensin II. On the other hand, the unicellular, primitive red alga Cyanidioschyzon merolae, whose genome size is comparable to those of the yeast, has both condensins I and II. Thus, there is no apparent relationship between the occurrence of condensin II and the size of eukaryotic genomes.
- Arabidopsis thaliana possesses two SMC2 paralogs, CAP-E1 and CAP-E2. While mutations in either gene alone do not significantly impair development, the double mutant is embryonic lethal.
- The ciliate Tetrahymena thermophila has condensin I only. Nevertheless, there are multiple paralogs for two of its regulatory subunits (CAP-D2 and CAP-H), and some of them specifically localize to either the macronucleus (responsible for gene expression) or the micronucleus (responsible for reproduction). Thus, this species has multiple condensin I complexes that have different regulatory subunits and display distinct nuclear localization. This is a very unique property that is not found in other species.

The following table summarizes the names of SMC complex subunits in representative eukaryotic model organisms.

Complex	Subunit	Vertebrate	D. melanogaster	C. elegans	S. cerevisiae	S. pombe	A. thaliana	T. thermophila
condensin I & II	SMC2 ATPase	CAP-E/ SMC2	Smc2	MIX-1	Smc2	Cut14	CAP-E1 & -E2	Smc2
condensin I & II	SMC4 ATPase	CAP-C/ SMC4	Smc4/ Gluon	SMC-4	Smc4	Cut3	CAP-C	Smc4
condensin I	kleisin	CAP-H	CAP-H/ Barren	DPY-26	Brn1	Cnd2	CAP-H	Cph1,2,3,4 & 5
condensin I	HEAT-IA	CAP-D2	CAP-D2	DPY-28	Ycs4	Cnd1	CAP-D2	Cpd1 & 2
condensin I	HEAT-IB	CAP-G	CAP-G	CAPG-1	Ycg1	Cnd3	CAP-G	Cpg1
condensin II	kleisin	CAP-H2	CAP-H2	KLE-2	-	-	CAP-H2/ HEB2	-
condensin II	HEAT-IIA	CAP-D3	CAP-D3	HCP-6	-	-	CAP-D3	-
condensin II	HEAT-IIB	CAP-G2	-	CAP-G2	-	-	CAP-G2/ HEB1	-
condensin I ^{DC}	SMC4 variant	-	-	DPY-27	-	-	-	-

Condensin is one of the three major SMC protein complexes found in eukaryotes. The other two are: cohesin, which is involved in sister chromatid cohesion and interphase chromosome organization; and the SMC5/6 complex, which functions in DNA repair and chromosome segregation.

=== Prokaryotic types ===
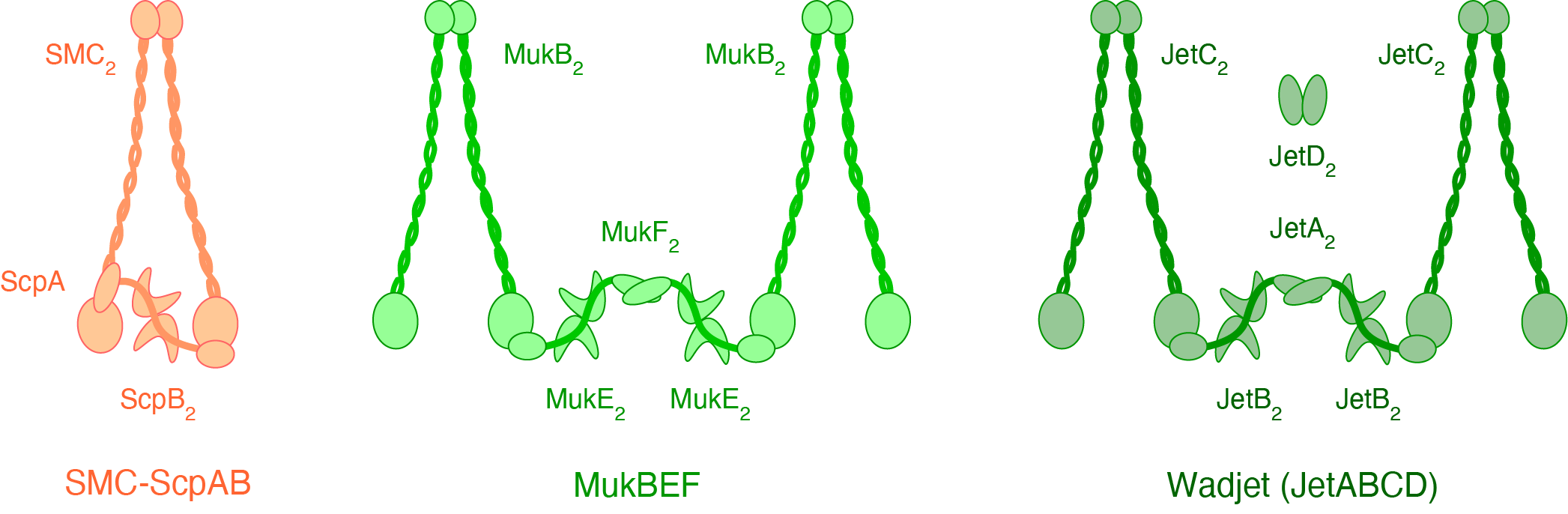
Figure 3. Prokaryotic condensin-like complexes

SMC-ScpAB: Condensin-like protein complexes also exist in prokaryotes, where they contribute to the organization and segregation of chromosomes (nucleoids). The best-studied example is the SMC–ScpAB complex (Figure 3, left), which is considered the evolutionary ancestor of the eukaryotic condensin complexes. Compared to its eukaryotic counterparts, SMC–ScpAB has a simpler architecture. For instance, while eukaryotic condensins contain an SMC heterodimer, prokaryotic SMC proteins form a homodimer. Among the regulatory subunits, ScpA belongs to the kleisin family, suggesting that the basic SMC–kleisin trimeric structure is conserved across prokaryotes and eukaryotes. By contrast, ScpB is classified as a member of the kite (Kleisin Interacting Tandem Elements) family, which is structurally distinct from the HEAT-repeat subunits found in eukaryotic condensins.

MukBEF: While most bacteria and archaea possess the SMC–ScpAB complex, a subset of gammaproteobacteria, including Escherichia coli, instead have a distinct SMC complex known as MukBEF. MukBEF forms a "dimer-of-dimers" through dimerization mediated by the kleisin subunit MukF (Figure 3, center). The third subunit, MukE, belongs to the kite family. Although sequence similarity between the subunits of MukBEF and those of SMC–ScpAB is low, their overall molecular architecture observed by electron microscopy and phenotypic defects in mutants suggest that the two are functional homologs. As such, they are often collectively referred to as prokaryotic condensins.

MksBEF/Wadjet: More recently, a third type of bacterial SMC complex (called MksBEF), structurally similar to MukBEF, has been reported. Pseudomonas aeruginosa have both SMC–ScpAB and MksBEF, which contribute to chromosome organization and segregation through distinct mechanisms. In contrast, in Corynebacterium glutamicum, SMC–ScpAB is responsible for chromosome architecture and segregation, whereas MksBEF, together with the nuclease subunit MksG, is specialized for plasmid defense. The MksBEFG complex is orthologous to the JetABCD complex in Bacillus cereus and the EptABCD complex in Mycobacterium smegmatis. These complexes, which serve a common function in plasmid defense, are collectively referred to as the Wadjet complexes (Figure 3, right).

The following table summarizes the names of SMC complex subunits in representative prokaryotic model organisms.

Complex	Subunit	B. subtilis	C. crescentus	E. coli	P. aeruginosa	C. glutamicum	B. cereus
SMC-ScpAB	SMC ATPase	SMC	SMC	-	SMC	SMC	SMC
SMC-ScpAB	kleisin	ScpA	ScpA	-	ScpA	ScpA	ScpA
SMC-ScpAB	kite	ScpB	ScpB	-	ScpB	ScpB	ScpB
MukBEF	SMC ATPase	-	-	MukB	-	-	-
MukBEF	kleisin	-	-	MukF	-	-	-
MukBEF	kite	-	-	MukE	-	-	-
MksBEF & Wadjet	SMC ATPase	-	-	-	MksB	MksB	JetC
MksBEF & Wadjet	kleisin	-	-	-	MksF	MksF	JetA
MksBEF & Wadjet	kite	-	-	-	MksE	MksE	JetB
MksBEF & Wadjet	nuclease	-	-	-	-	MksG	JetD

== Molecular structures ==
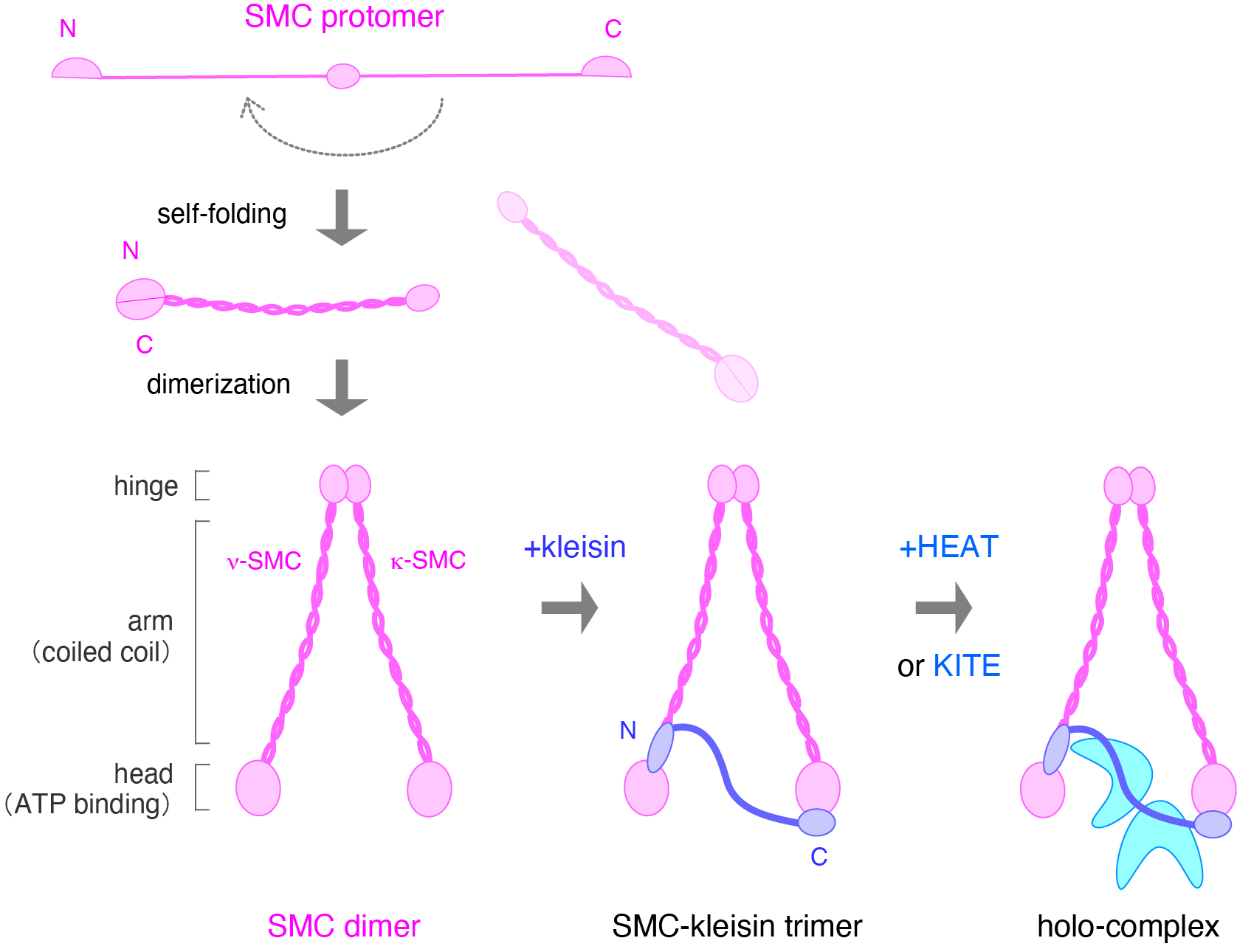
Figure 4. Basic structure of a condensin complex

SMC dimers that act as the core subunits of condensins display a highly characteristic V-shape, each arm of which is composed of anti-parallel coiled-coils (Figure 4; see SMC proteins for details). The length of each coiled-coil arm reaches ~50 nm, which corresponds to the length of ~150 bp of double-stranded DNA (dsDNA). On the other hand, fast-speed atomic force microscopy has demonstrated that the arms of an SMC dimer is far more flexible than was expected.

The formation of a condensin or condensin-like complex involves the association of an SMC dimer with non-SMC subunits (Figure 4). First, the N-terminal domain of the kleisin subunit binds to the neck region (a segment of the coiled coil near the head domain) of one SMC protein, while its C-terminal domain binds to the cap region (part of the head domain) of the other SMC subunit. These interactions result in the formation of a asymmetric ring-like architecture. Finally, two HEAT-repeat subunits (or two kite subunits depending on the complex) associate with the central region of the kleisin, completing the assembly of the holo-complex. MukBEF and Wadjet form higher-order assemblies through dimerization mediated by their kleisin subunits, a configuration often referred to as a "dimer-of-dimers" (Figure 3).

Structural information on individual complexes or their subcomplexes has been reported as follows:

- Prokaryotic SMC-ScpAB: Early X-ray crystallography studies revealed partial structures of ScpAB as well as the interaction interface between SMC and kleisin subunits.
- Prokaryotic MukBEF: In addition to early X-ray crystallography studies, more recent analyses using cryo-EM have visualized the steps of dissociation from DNA and of loading onto DNA.
- Prokaryotic Wadjet: The structure of the Wadjet complex, involved in plasmid defense, has been resolved by cryo-EM.
- Eukaryotic condensins: Several structures of subcomplexes and subdomains have been reported, including the hinge and arm domains of an SMC2-SMC4 dimer, a CAP-G(ycg1)/CAP-H(brn1) subcomplex, and a CAP-D2(ycs4)/CAP-H(brn1) subcomplex. More recently, a series of cryo-EM studies has shown that condensin undergoes large conformational changes that are coupled with ATP-binding and hydrolysis by its SMC subunits. A comparative analysis of human condensin I and condensin II has also been reported.

== Molecular activities ==
=== DNA compaction ===
Among the various molecular activities attributed to condensins, perhaps the most intuitive is its ability to compact DNA by folding it, thereby reducing its effective length. Indeed, an early single-molecule experiment using magnetic tweezers have shown that condensin I purified from Xenopus egg metaphase extracts actively shortens the length of DNA in an ATP hydrolysis-dependent manner, and this process can be observed in real time. More recently, a comparable yet less dynamic compaction process mediated by budding yeast condensin was observed in the same experimental setup Furthermore, optical tweezers–based assays combining single-molecule DNA manipulation with Xenopus egg extracts have revealed that, among the multiple DNA-compacting activities present in mitotic extracts, condensins make the dominant contribution.

=== DNA supercoiling ===
Early studies using condensin I purified from Xenopus egg extracts demonstrated that the complex introduces positive supercoils into double-stranded DNA in an ATP hydrolysis–dependent manner, in the presence of type I topoisomerases. Although this activity is often described as positive DNA supercoiling, it differs fundamentally from that of topoisomerases, since condensin I lacks DNA cleavage and re-ligation activity. Similar activities have also been observed with condensin complexes from nematodes and budding yeast. Furthermore, a modified assay combined with a type II topoisomerase has shown that Xenopus condensin I can generate "two oriented" supercoils in an ATP hydrolysis-dependent manner. These activities are stimulated by Cdk1-mediated phosphorylation in vitro, suggesting that they may constitute an essential mechanism underlying mitotic chromosome condensation. Through this supercoiling activity, condensin may not only facilitate chromatin compaction but also promote the resolution and separation of sister chromatids by aiding the action of topoisomerase II.

=== DNA loop extrusion ===
Among the various biochemical activities of condensins, loop extrusion has recently attracted the most attention. The concept of loop extrusion, where condensins actively "extrude" DNA to form loops, was first proposed theoretically and later supported by computer simulations. Experimentally, budding yeast condensin was shown to translocate along double-stranded DNA in an ATP hydrolysis–dependent manner. This was soon followed by direct visualization of loop extrusion, in which condensin extrudes and enlarges DNA loops over time. Furthermore, condensin has been shown to bypass other condensin complexes upon collision on the same DNA molecule, and even traverse large obstacles significantly exceeding its own size.

The molecular mechanism underlying loop extrusion by condensins is an active area of investigation, with insights emerging from structural studies as well. Current models suggest that multiple condensin subunits interact with DNA in a coordinated manner, tightly coupled to the ATPase cycle of the SMC core subunits. These interactions are thought to be mechanistically intricate and highly dynamic. Some evidence also points to a potential link between condensin-mediated loop extrusion and supercoiling, although the exact mechanism of this link remains unclear. Moreover, whether and how mitosis-specific phosphorylation of condensin subunits modulates loop extrusion activity has yet to be fully elucidated.

=== DNA loop capture ===
Although accumulating evidence supports the loop extrusion model, direct evidence for its occurrence in vivo remains lacking. As an alternative, a mechanism termed "loop capture" (or "diffusion capture") has been proposed. In this model, a condensin complex initially binds one segment of DNA and then captures a second DNA segment that comes into close proximity along the same DNA molecule, thereby forming a DNA loop. Unlike loop extrusion, loop capture does not require active translocation along DNA; instead, loops form through thermodynamic fluctuations. Loop capture and loop extrusion may not be necessarily mutually exclusive and may function in parallel within cells to promote DNA loop formation and expansion.

=== Chromosome assembly and reconstitution ===
The supercoiling and loop extrusion activities of condensin have been primarily demonstrated using experiments with naked DNA as the substrate. To investigate condensin function under more physiological conditions, a powerful in vitro assay using Xenopus egg extracts has been in use. In this system, metaphase extracts prepared from unfertilized Xenopus eggs are used to recapitulate mitotic chromosome assembly in a test tube. By immunodepleting endogenous condensin from extracts and supplementing them with wild-type or mutant recombinant condensin complexes, researchers can evaluate the contribution of specific subunits or mutations to chromosome assembly activity. This system has demonstrated that both ATP binding and hydrolysis by the SMC subunits of condensin I are essential for chromosome assembly. It also revealed that the antagonistic actions of the two HEAT-repeat subunits, as well as condensin–condensin interactions, are critical for the dynamic organization of chromosome axes. Moreover, linker histones have been shown to compete with condensins, thereby modulating chromosome morphology in this system. Remarkably, even under nucleosome-depleted conditions, the extract is capable of assembling chromosome-like structures in a manner dependent on condensins and topoisomerase II. This observation indicates that condensins possess biologically relevant activity on nucleosome-free DNA, further highlighting their central role in chromosome architecture beyond its interaction with chromatinized templates.

More recently, an in vitro chromosome reconstitution system using purified proteins has been developed, confirming the essential role of condensin I in chromosome assembly. In this system, chromosomes can be reconstituted from a simple substrate (sperm nuclei) by supplementing with only six purified components: core histones, three types of histone chaperones, topoisomerase II, and condensin I. For condensin I to exert its chromosome assembly activity in this reconstitution system, it must be phosphorylated by the mitotic kinase cyclin B-Cdk1. Among the essential histone chaperones identified, FACT (Facilitates Chromatin Transcription) transiently destabilizes and reassembles nucleosomes, thereby facilitating the folding of nucleosomal fibers by condensin I and topoisomerase II.

=== Condensin I vs condensin II ===
How similar or how different are the molecular activities of condensin I and condensin II? Both complexes share the same two SMC subunits (SMC2 and SMC4), but each has a distinct set of three non-SMC subunits (see Fig. 2). Subtle differences in the balance of these non-SMC subunits are thought to account for differences in loop formation speed and chromosome assembly activity between the two complexes. Interestingly, experimental studies have shown that by introducing specific mutations, it is possible to convert condensin I into a complex with condensin II-like activity. Likewise, condensin II can be engineered to exhibit condensin I-like properties.

=== Mathematical modeling and computer simulations ===
Several mathematical modeling and computer simulation studies of mitotic chromosome assembly, based on the molecular activities of condensins, have been reported. Representative ones include modeling based on loop extrusion, loop capture, a combination of looping and condensin-condensin interactions, and bridging-induced attraction.

== Functions in chromosome assembly and segregation ==
=== Mitosis ===
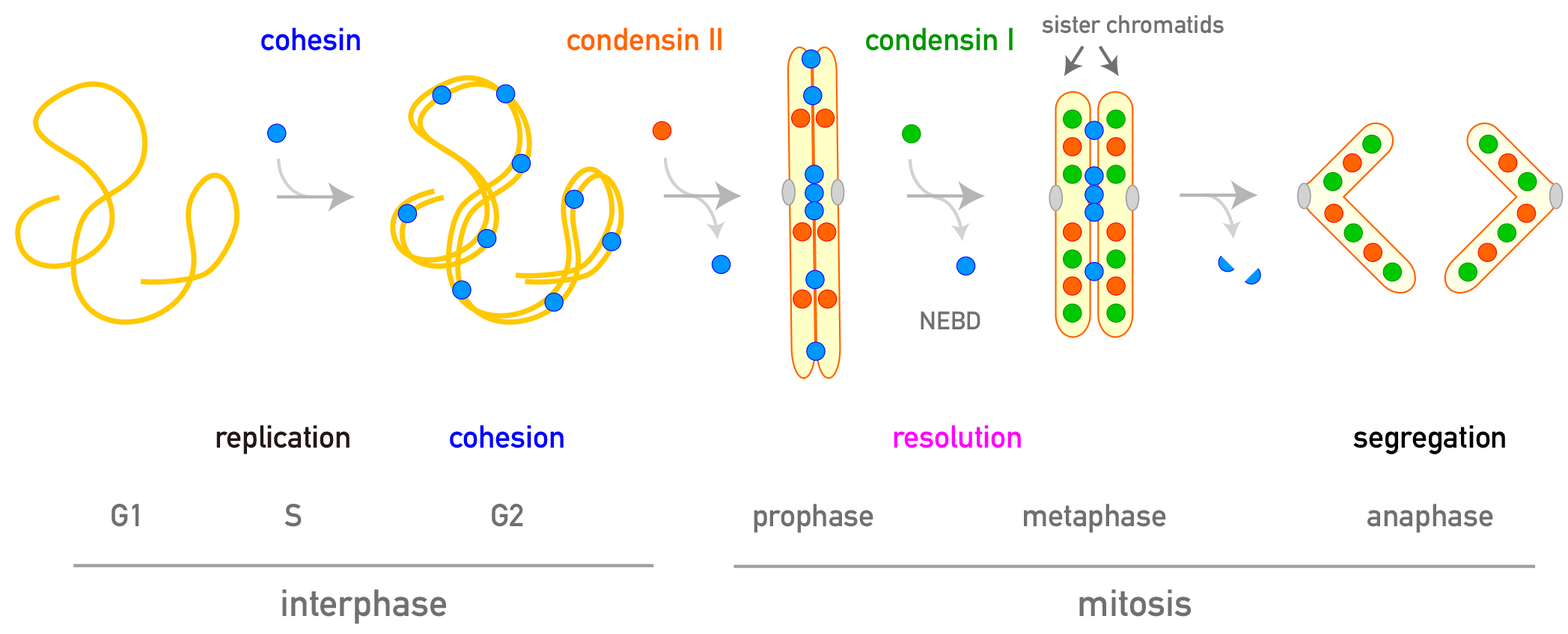
Figure 5. Chromosome dynamics during mitosis in eukaryotes

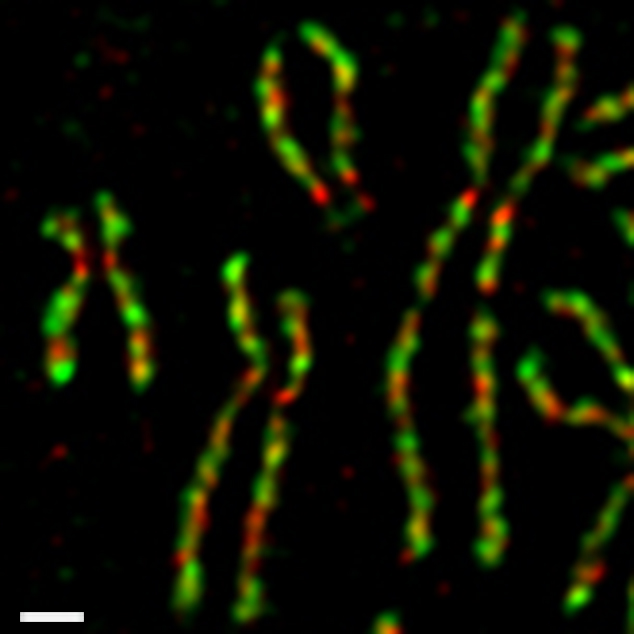
Figure 6. Distribution of condensin I (green) and condensin II (red) in human metaphase chromosomes. Bar, 1 μm.

In human tissue culture cells, the two condensin complexes are regulated differently during the mitotic cell cycle (Figure 5). Condensin II is present within the cell nucleus during interphase and participates in an early stage of chromosome condensation within the prophase nucleus. On the other hand, condensin I is present in the cytoplasm during interphase, and gains access to chromosomes only after the nuclear envelope breaks down (NEBD) at the end of prophase. During prometaphase and metaphase, condensin I and condensin II cooperate to assemble rod-shaped chromosomes, in which two sister chromatids are fully resolved.

Such differential dynamics of the two complexes is observed in Xenopus egg extracts, mouse oocytes, and neural stem cells, indicating that it is part of a fundamental regulatory mechanism conserved among different organisms and cell types. Indeed, recent studies have shown that forced localization of condensin I to the interphase nucleus can lead to abnormal chromosome segregation during subsequent mitosis. It is most likely that this mechanism ensures the ordered action of the two complexes, namely, condensin II first and condensin I later.

On metaphase chromosomes, condensins I and II are both enriched in the central axis in a non-overlapping fashion (Figure 6). Depletion experiments in vivo and immunodepletion experiments in Xenopus egg extracts demonstrate that the two complexes have distinct functions in assembling metaphase chromosomes. Cells deficient in condensin functions are not arrested at a specific stage of cell cycle, displaying chromosome segregation defects (i.e., anaphase bridges) and progressing through abnormal cytokinesis.

The requirement for condensin I and II in mitosis varies among species.

- In mice (Mus musculus), both condensin I and condensin II are essential for embryonic development, as shown by gene knockout experiments. The two complexes exhibit partially overlapping but also distinct functions during mitosis.
- The primitive red alga C. merolae and the land plant A. thaliana possess both condensin I and II, yet condensin II is dispensable for mitotic chromosome segregation in these species.
- In the early embryos of the nematode C. elegans, condensin II plays a predominant role, effectively reversing the typical functional relationship between the two complexes. This may be related to the organism's holocentric chromosomes, in which kinetochores are distributed along the entire chromosome length.
- In the fruit fly D. melanogaster, one of the condensin II–specific subunits (CAP-G2) is missing. The remaining condensin II subunits, CAP-D3 and CAP-H2, are not essential for mitosis but play significant roles in meiosis.
- Some fungi, including S. cerevisiae and S. pombe, lack condensin II altogether. In these organisms, condensin I functions in both mitosis and meiosis.

These species-specific differences offer valuable insights into the evolution of chromosome architecture and genome size (see also the section "Evolutionary implications"). The following table summarizes the requirement for condensin I and II during mitosis in representative eukaryotic model organisms.

species	M. musculus	D. melanogaster	C. elegans	S. cerevisiae	S. pombe	A. thaliana	C. merolae
genome size	~2,500 Mb	140 Mb	100 Mb	12 Mb	14 Mb	125 Mb	16 Mb
condensin I	essential	essential	?	essential	essential	essential	essential
condensin II	essential	non-essential	essential	-	-	non-essential	non-essential

It has recently become possible that cell cycle-dependent structural changes of chromosomes are monitored by a genomics-based method known as Hi-C (High-throughput chromosome conformation capture). The impact of condensin deficiency on chromosome conformation has been addressed in budding yeast, fission yeast, and the chicken DT40 cells. The outcome of these studies strongly supports the notion that condensins play crucial roles in mitotic chromosome assembly and that condensin I and II have distinct functions in this process. Moreover, quantitative imaging analyses allow researchers to count the number of condensin complexes present on human metaphase chromosomes.

=== Meiosis ===
Condensins also play important roles in chromosome assembly and segregation in meiosis. Genetic studies have been reported in S. cerevisiae, D. melanogaster, and C. elegans. In mice, requirements for condensin subunits in meiosis have been addressed by antibody-mediated blocking experiments and conditional gene knockout analyses. In mammalian meiosis I, the functional contribution of condensin II appears bigger than that of condensin I. As has been shown in mitosis, however, the two condensin complexes have both overlapping and non-overlapping functions, too, in meiosis. Unlike cohesin, no meiosis-specific subunits of condensins have been identified so far.

== Chromosomal functions outside of mitosis or meiosis ==
Recent studies have shown that condensins participate in a wide variety of chromosome functions outside of mitosis or meiosis.

- In S. cerevisiae, condensin I (the sole condensin in this organism) is involved in copy number regulation of the rDNA repeat as well as in clustering of the tRNA genes.
- In S. pombe, condensin I is involved in the regulation of replicative checkpoint and clustering of genes transcribed by RNA polymerase III. Some of the newly isolated mutants exhibiting temperature-sensitive and/or DNA damage-sensitive phenotypes were found to carry mutations in the HEAT subunits of condensin, indicating that these subunits play a role in proper DNA repair.
- While early studies suggested that condensins might directly regulate gene expression, more recent findings have challenged this hypothesis at least in yeast.
- In C. elegans, a third condensin complex (condensin I^{DC}) related to condensin I regulates higher-order structure of X chromosomes as a major regulator of dosage compensation. Curiously, in this species, condensin I not only fulfills a role analogous to that of vertebrate cohesin in organizing interphase chromosomes, but also coexists with a unique SMC-like protein called SMCL-1. SMCL-1 is a small protein that lacks the hinge and coiled-coil domains typical of SMC proteins, and functions as a negative regulator of condensins. Notably, SMCL-1 is found only in Caenorhabditis species that also possess condensin I^{DC}, suggesting that it evolved to enable fine-tuned regulation of the two condensin I complexes.
- In D. melanogaster, condensin II subunits contribute to the dissolution of polytene chromosomes and the formation of chromosome territories in ovarian nurse cells. Evidence is available that they negatively regulate transvection in diploid cells. It has also been reported that condensin I components are required to ensure correct gene expression in neurons following cell-cycle exit.
- In A. thaliana, condensin II is essential for tolerance of excess boron stress, possibly by alleviating DNA damage.
- In mammalian cells, it is likely that condensin II is involved in the regulation of interphase chromosome architecture and function. For instance, in human cells, condensin II participates in the initiation of sister chromatid resolution during S phase, long time before mitotic prophase when sister chromatids become cytologically visible. Moreover, a recent study has demonstrated that condensin II collaborates with cohesin to establish and maintain interphase chromosome territories.
- In mouse interphase nuclei, pericentromeric heterochromatin on different chromosomes associates with each other, forming a large structure known as chromocenters. Cells deficient in condensin II, but not in condensin I, display hyperclustering of chromocenters, indicating that condensin II has a specific role in suppressing chromocenter clustering.

== Regulation ==
=== Spatiotemporal regulation ===
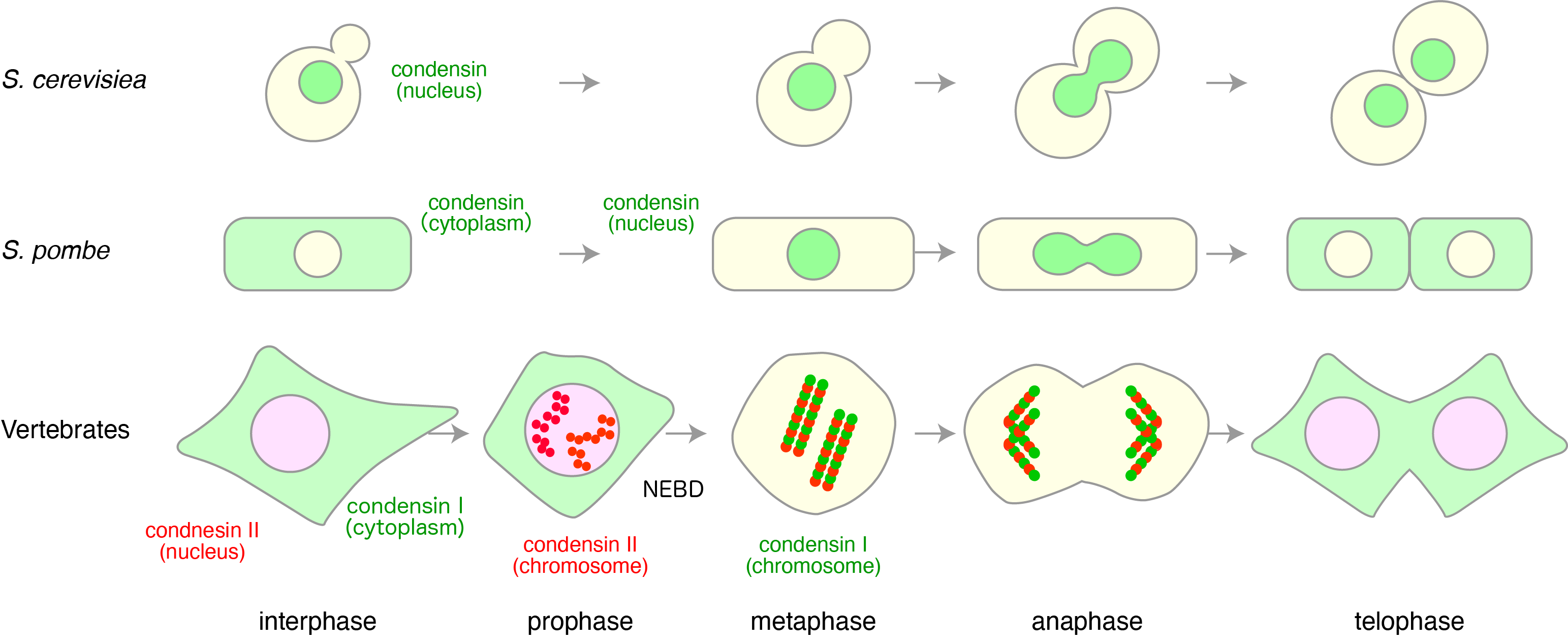
Figure 7. Spatiotemporal regulation of condensins

Condensin activity is subject to spatiotemporal regulation during the cell cycle, although the specific regulatory patterns vary among species.

- Most fungi possess only a single condensin complex. Many fungal species undergo "closed mitosis", in which the nuclear envelope remains intact throughout mitosis. In S. cerevisiae, condensin remains in the nucleus throughout the cell cycle, and becomes active during mitosis to promote chromosome condensation (Figure 7). In contrast, in S. pombe, condensin is localized in the cytoplasm during interphase and translocates into the nucleus upon mitotic entry, where it induces chromosome condensation (Figure 7).
- In vertebrate cells, condensin II is localized in the nucleus, whereas condensin I resides in the cytoplasm during interphase (Figure 7). Chromosome condensation begins in prophase, prior to nuclear envelope breakdown, and is initially driven by condensin II. Upon nuclear envelope breakdown in prometaphase, condensin I gains access to chromatin; from that point onward, both condensin complexes function cooperatively in promoting chromosome condensation.

=== Regulation by post-translational modifications ===
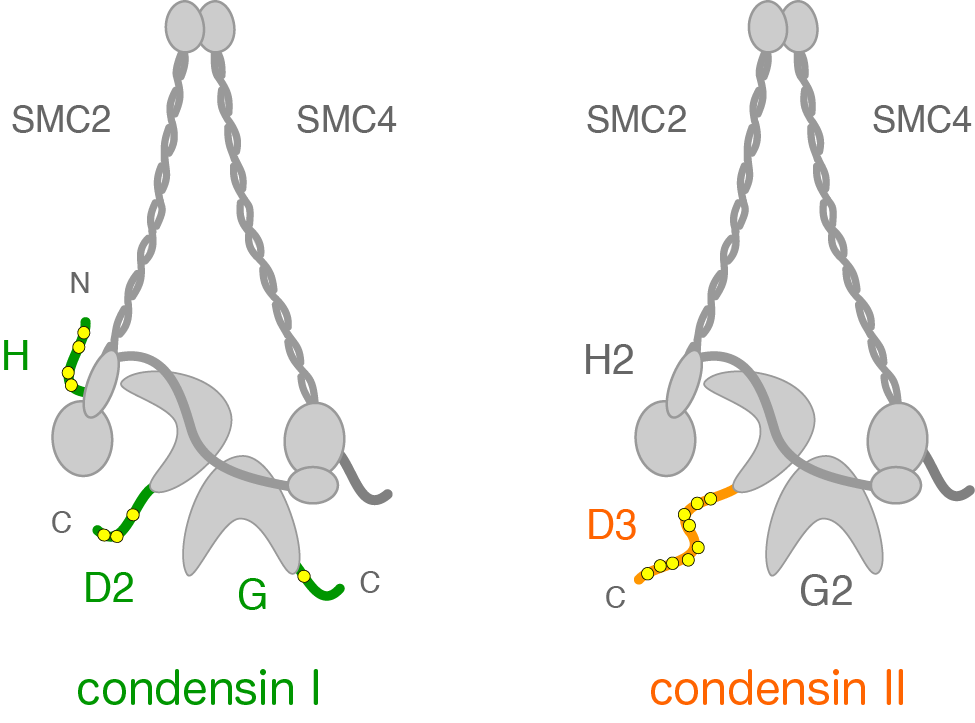
Figure 8. Major targets of Cdk1-mediated phosphorylation are enriched within IDRs of the non-SMC subunits of human condensin I and II complexes

Condensin subunits undergo various post-translational modifications (PTMs) in a cell cycle–dependent manner. Among these, phosphorylation during mitosis is the most extensively studied. The primary phosphorylation motifs targeted by Cdk1, namely S/TP sequences, tend to be enriched in the intrinsically disordered regions (IDRs) located at the termini of condensin subunits. However, the distribution of these motifs and their functional contributions to in vivo regulation vary significantly across species.

- In S. cerevisiae, phosphorylation of the N-terminal region of the SMC4 subunit has been implicated in regulating the dynamics of chromatin binding.
- In S. pombe, phosphorylation at the N-terminus of SMC4 is involved in controlling the nuclear translocation of condensin during mitosis.
- In vertebrates, Cdk1-dependent phosphorylation has been shown to be essential for the supercoiling activity of condensin I and for its chromosome assembly activity. Experiments using Xenopus egg extracts further demonstrated that phosphorylation of the N-terminal region of the CAP-H subunit contributes, at least in part, to the mitosis-specific regulation of chromosome binding by condensin I (Fig. 10, left). More recently, analyses using a reconstituted system have led to the proposal of a two-step regulatory model for condensin I, mediated by phosphorylation and dephosphorylation at distinct sites. This model suggests an asymmetric regulatory mechanism in which condensin I is activated cautiously through stepwise phosphorylation, but inactivated rapidly through dephosphorylation. Such regulation may serve to confine the highly active state of condensin I to a limited temporal window during mitosis.
- In condensin II, Cdk1-mediated phosphorylation of the C-terminal region of the CAP-D3 subunit is involved in regulating the activity of the complex (Figure 9, right). CAP-D3 has also been identified as a substrate of protein phosphatase PP2A-B55.

In addition to Cdk1, other kinases have been implicated in condensin regulation in several organisms. For condensin I, Aurora B kinase and Polo-like kinase (Polo) have been shown to act as positive regulators, whereas Casein kinase 2 (CK2) acts as a negative regulator. For condensin II, involvement of Polo and the spindle checkpoint kinase Mps1 has been suggested.

=== Regulation by Short Linear Motifs (SLiMs) ===
Recently, short amino acid sequences known as Short Linear Motifs (SLiMs) have gained attention as key regulators of condensin function.

- In S. cerevisiae, SLiMs in Sgo1 and Lrs4 mediate the recruitment of condensin to the pericentromeric and rDNA regions, respectively, through interactions with the CAP-G subunit.
- In human condensin I, a SLiM-like motif located in the N-terminal region of CAP-H has been shown to play an essential role in autoinhibition of the complex. Subsequent studies revealed that this motif, together with the C-terminal region of CAP-D2, interacts with CAP-G, and that the SLiM of the chromokinesin KIF4A competes with this interaction, thereby relieving the inhibitory constraint on condensin I activity.
- In human condensin II, a SLiM in the microcephaly-associated protein MCPH1 interacts with CAP-G2, contributing to the suppression of condensin II activity in interphase. During mitosis, a SLiM in M18BP1, a subunit of the Mis18 complex involved in loading CENP-A at centromeres, competes with the SLiM of MCPH1, thereby activating condensin II.

These SLiM-mediated interactions are further regulated by phosphorylation of the motif itself or its surrounding regions.

=== Regulation by proteolysis ===
It has been reported that the CAP-H2 subunit of condensin II is degraded in D. melanogaster through the action of the SCFSlimb ubiquitin ligase.

== Relevance to diseases ==
It was demonstrated that MCPH1, one of the proteins responsible for human primary microcephaly, has the ability to negatively regulate condensin II. In mcph1 patient cells, condensin II (but not condensin I) is hyperactivated, leading to premature chromosome condensation in G2 phase (i.e., before entering mitosis). There is no evidence, however, that misregulation of condensin II is directly related to the etiology of mcph1 microcephaly. More recently, it has been reported that hypomorphic mutations in condensin I or II subunits cause microcephaly in humans. In mice, hypomorphic mutations in condensin II subunits cause specific defects in T cell development, leading to T cell lymphoma. It is interesting to note that cell types with specialized cell division modes, such as neural stem cells and T cells, are particularly susceptible to mutations in condensin subunits.

== Evolutionary implications ==
The presence of condensin-like complexes in prokaryotes suggests that the evolutionary origin of condensins predates that of histones.

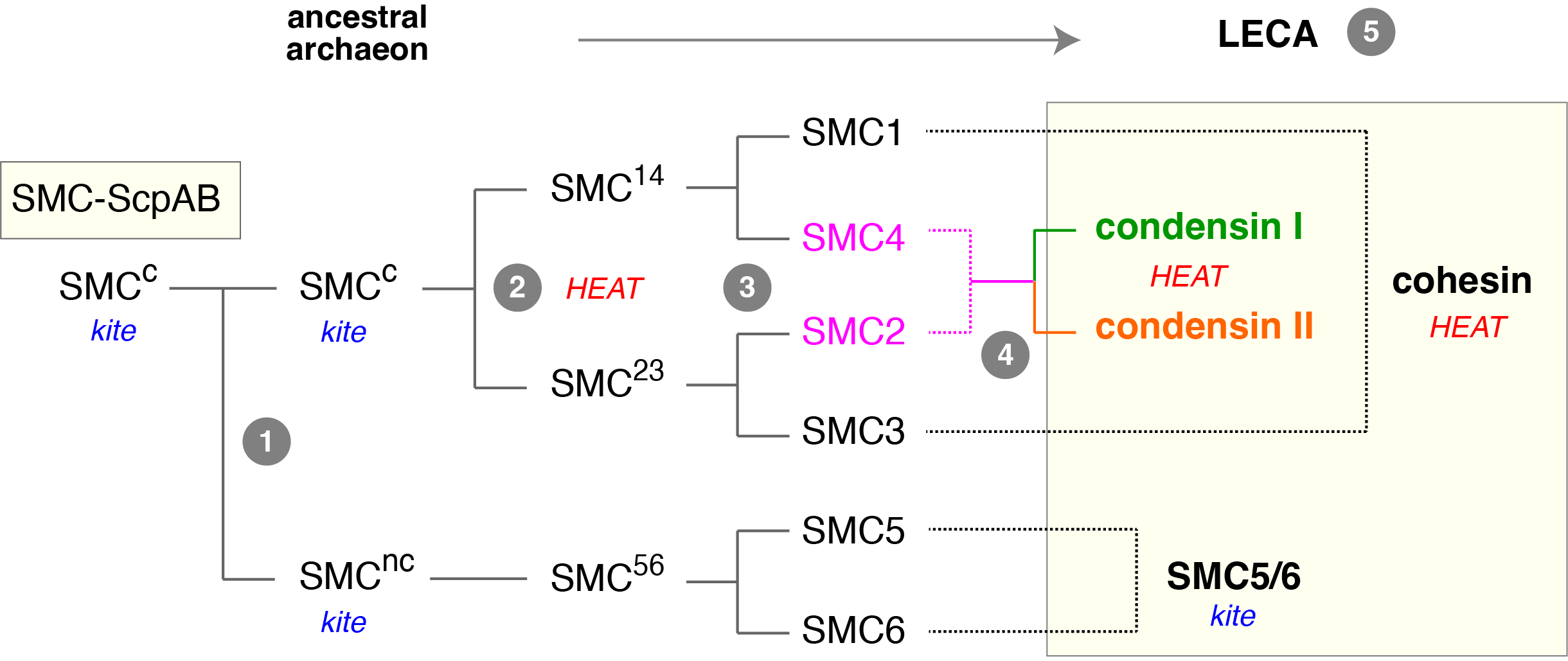
Figure 9. Evolution of eukayotic condensins: SMC^{c}, canonical SMC; SMC^{nc}, non-canonical SMC; SMC^{14}, ancestor of SMC1 & SMC4; SMC^{23}, ancestor of SMC2 & SMC3; SMC5^{56}, ancestor of SMC5 & SMC6

The proposed evolutionary scenario for eukaryotic condensins is as follows (Figure 9):

1. In the archaeal ancestor of eukaryotes, a gene duplication event gave rise to a non-canonical SMC from a canonical SMC. This non-canonical SMC later evolved into the ancestral form of the eukaryotic SMC5/6 complex.
2. In the early stages of eukaryogenesis, a duplication of the canonical SMC, accompanied by the replacement of KITEs with HEATs, gave rise to the common ancestor of cohesin and condensin complexes.
3. A second duplication of SMC subsequently produced the distinct ancestral complexes of cohesin and condensin.
4. In the ancestor of condensin, a duplication of non-SMCs led to the emergence of two distinct complexes, condensin I and condensin II.
5. The last eukaryotic common ancestor (LECA) is thought to have possessed both condensin I and condensin II. During subsequent evolution, however, some lineages lost part or all of the non-SMC subunits specific to condensin II (see the section of Subunit composition and phylogeny).

Then how are the two condensin complexes in eukaryotic cells functionally specialized? As discussed above, the relative contribution of condensins I and II to mitosis varies among different organisms. They play equally important roles in mammalian mitosis, whereas condensin I has a predominant role over condensin II in many other species. In those species, condensin II might have been adapted for various non-essential functions other than mitosis. Although there is no apparent relationship between the occurrence of condensin II and the size of genomes, it seems that the functional contribution of condensin II becomes big as the genome size increases. A recent, comprehensive Hi-C study argues from an evolutionary point of view that condensin II acts as a determinant that converts post-mitotic Rabl configurations into interphase chromosome territories. The relative contribution of the two condensin complexes to mitotic chromosome architecture also change during development, making an impact on the morphology of mitotic chromosomes. Thus, the balancing act of condensins I and II is apparently fine-tuned in both evolution and development.

== See also ==
- chromosome
- chromosome condensation
- nucleoid
- mitosis
- meiosis
- cell cycle
- cohesin
- SMC protein
- ATPase
- HEAT repeat
- Topoisomerase II
- DNA supercoil
