= NCAPG2 =

Protein-coding gene in the species Homo sapiens

Identifiers
- Aliases: NCAPG2, CAP-G2, CAPG2, LUZP5, MTB, hCAP-G2, non-SMC condensin II complex subunit G2, 3KS
- External IDs: OMIM: 608532; MGI: 1923294; GeneCards: NCAPG2

Gene location (Human)
Chr.	Chromosome 7 (human)
Band	7q36.3	Start	158,631,169 bp
Band	7q36.3	End	158,704,804 bp

Gene location (Mouse)
Chr.	Chromosome 12 (mouse)
Band	12|12 F2	Start	116,369,022 bp
Band	12|12 F2	End	116,427,351 bp
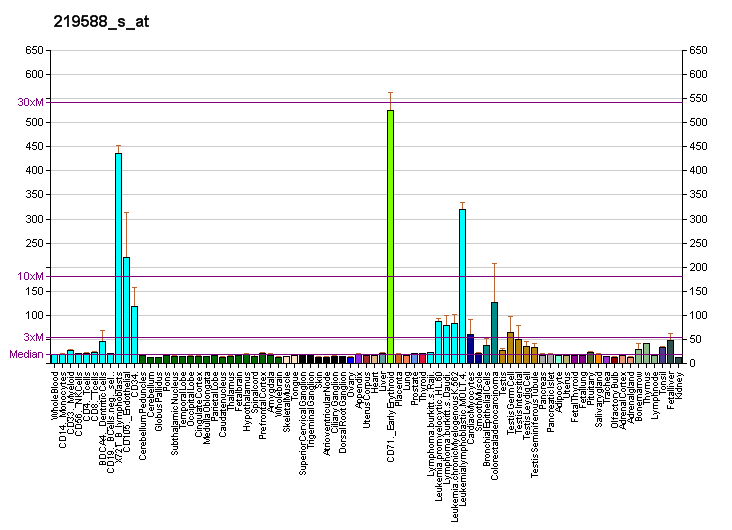
RNA expression pattern
Bgee	Human / Mouse (ortholog); Top expressed in: ventricular zone; secondary oocyte; sperm; ganglionic eminence; bone marrow; bone marrow cell; trabecular bone; stromal cell of endometrium; gonad; right testis / Top expressed in: nasal epithelium; olfactory epithelium; secondary oocyte; primary oocyte; zygote; ventricular zone; fetal liver hematopoietic progenitor cell; tail of embryo; dermis; superior cervical ganglion; More reference expression data
BioGPS	More reference expression data
Gene ontology
Molecular function	methylated histone binding; protein binding; bHLH transcription factor binding; molecular function regulator
Cellular component	membrane; nucleus; nucleoplasm; condensin complex; nuclear speck
Biological process	cell division; cell cycle; chromosome condensation; inner cell mass cell proliferation; transcription by RNA polymerase II; erythrocyte differentiation; negative regulation of erythrocyte differentiation; positive regulation of protein tyrosine kinase activity; positive regulation of signaling receptor activity
Sources:Amigo / QuickGO
Orthologs
Databases	NCBI: entry; OMA: entry
Species	Human	Mouse
Entrez	54892	76044
Ensembl	ENSG00000146918	ENSMUSG00000042029
UniProt	Q86XI2	Q6DFV1
RefSeq (mRNA)	NM_001281932; NM_001281933; NM_017760	NM_133762
RefSeq (protein)	NP_001268861; NP_001268862; NP_060230	NP_598523
Location (UCSC)	Chr 7: 158.63 – 158.7 Mb	Chr 12: 116.37 – 116.43 Mb
PubMed search
- Wikidata
View/Edit Human	View/Edit Mouse

Condensin-2 complex subunit G2 (CAP-G2) also known as chromosome-associated protein G2 (CAP-G2) or leucine zipper protein 5 (LUZP5) is a protein that in humans is encoded by the NCAPG2 gene. CAP-G2 is a subunit of condensin II, a large protein complex involved in chromosome condensation. It interacts with PLK1 through its C-terminal region during mitosis

== Clinical importance ==
Mutations in this gene in humans have been associated with severe neurodevelopmental defects, failure to thrive, ocular abnormalities, and defects in urogenital and limb morphogenesis.
