= NCAPH2 =

Protein-coding gene in the species Homo sapiens

Identifiers
- Aliases: NCAPH2, CAPH2, non-SMC condensin II complex subunit H2
- External IDs: OMIM: 611230; MGI: 1289164; GeneCards: NCAPH2

Gene location (Human)
| Chr. | Chromosome 22 (human) |
| Band | 22q13.33 | Start | 50,508,224 bp |
| Band | 22q13.33 | End | 50,524,780 bp |

Gene location (Mouse)
| Chr. | Chromosome 15 (mouse) |
| Band | 15 E3|15 44.84 cM | Start | 89,239,922 bp |
| Band | 15 E3|15 44.84 cM | End | 89,257,029 bp |
RNA expression pattern
| Bgee | Human / Mouse (ortholog); Top expressed in: cerebellar hemisphere; right hemisphere of cerebellum; right testis; left testis; ventricular zone; vena cava; ganglionic eminence; anterior pituitary; apex of heart; right frontal lobe / Top expressed in: spermatocyte; ventricular zone; dentate gyrus of hippocampal formation granule cell; lip; blastocyst; corneal stroma; right kidney; yolk sac; superior frontal gyrus; muscle of thigh; More reference expression data |
| BioGPS | n/a |
Gene ontology
| Molecular function | protein binding; chromatin binding |
| Cellular component | membrane; chromosome; nucleus; nucleoplasm; cell junction; intercellular bridge; condensed chromosome; condensin complex |
| Biological process | chromosome condensation; female meiotic nuclear division; meiotic chromosome condensation; T cell differentiation in thymus; chromosome organization; mitotic sister chromatid separation; female meiosis chromosome separation; mitotic chromosome condensation |
Sources:Amigo / QuickGO
Orthologs
| Databases | NCBI: entry; OMA: entry |
| Species | Human | Mouse |
| Entrez | 29781 | 52683 |
| Ensembl | ENSG00000025770 | ENSMUSG00000008690 |
| UniProt | Q6IBW4 | Q8BSP2 |
| RefSeq (mRNA) | NM_001185011; NM_014551; NM_152299 | NM_001115132; NM_001271600; NM_001271601 |
| RefSeq (protein) | NP_001171940; NP_055366; NP_689512 | NP_001108604; NP_001258529; NP_001258530 |
| Location (UCSC) | Chr 22: 50.51 – 50.52 Mb | Chr 15: 89.24 – 89.26 Mb |
| PubMed search |
- Wikidata
| View/Edit Human | View/Edit Mouse |

Condensin-2 complex subunit H2, also known as chromosome-associated protein H2 (CAP-H2) or non-SMC condensin II complex subunit H2 (NCAPH2), is a protein that in humans is encoded by the NCAPH2 gene. CAP-H2 is a subunit of condensin II, a large protein complex involved in chromosome condensation.
