= NCAPG =

Protein-coding gene in the species Homo sapiens

Identifiers
- Aliases: NCAPG, CAPG, CHCG, NY-MEL-3, YCG1, non-SMC condensin I complex subunit G
- External IDs: OMIM: 606280; MGI: 1930197; GeneCards: NCAPG

Gene location (Human)
Chr.	Chromosome 4 (human)
Band	4p15.31	Start	17,810,979 bp
Band	4p15.31	End	17,844,865 bp

Gene location (Mouse)
Chr.	Chromosome 5 (mouse)
Band	5|5 B3	Start	45,827,261 bp
Band	5|5 B3	End	45,857,888 bp
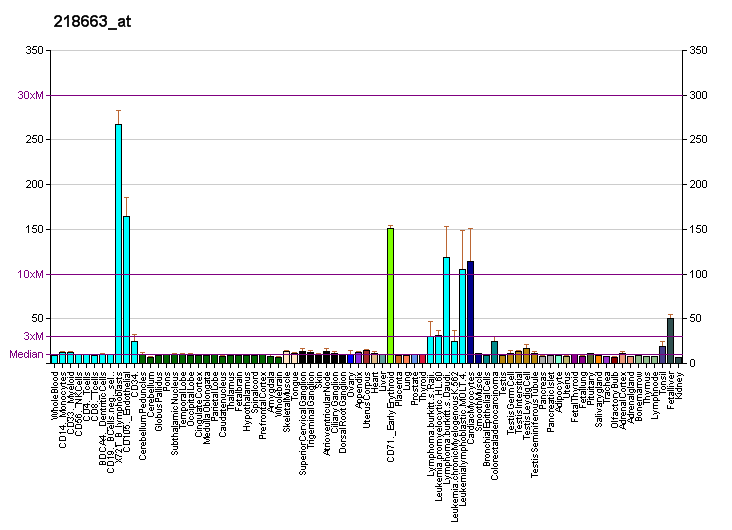

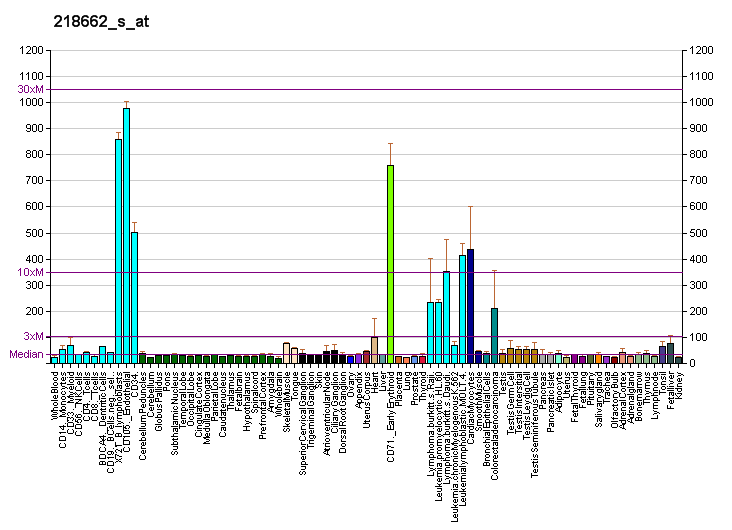
RNA expression pattern
Bgee	Human / Mouse (ortholog); Top expressed in: ventricular zone; embryo; ganglionic eminence; gonad; trabecular bone; sperm; bone marrow; gingival epithelium; testicle; amniotic fluid / Top expressed in: otic placode; secondary oocyte; otic vesicle; primary oocyte; zygote; saccule; spermatocyte; epiblast; spermatid; tail of embryo; More reference expression data
BioGPS	More reference expression data
Gene ontology
Molecular function	protein binding
Cellular component	condensin complex; cytosol; membrane; condensed chromosome; nucleus; chromosome; condensed chromosome, centromeric region; cytoplasm
Biological process	cell division; cell cycle; mitotic chromosome condensation; chromosome condensation
Sources:Amigo / QuickGO
Orthologs
Databases	NCBI: entry; OMA: entry
Species	Human	Mouse
Entrez	64151	54392
Ensembl	ENSG00000109805	ENSMUSG00000015880
UniProt	Q9BPX3	E9PWG6
RefSeq (mRNA)	NM_022346	NM_019438
RefSeq (protein)	NP_071741	NP_062311
Location (UCSC)	Chr 4: 17.81 – 17.84 Mb	Chr 5: 45.83 – 45.86 Mb
PubMed search
- Wikidata
View/Edit Human	View/Edit Mouse

Condensin complex subunit 3 also known as condensin subunit CAP-G (CAP-G) or non-SMC condensin I complex subunit G (NCAPG) is a protein that in humans is encoded by the NCAPG gene. CAP-G is a subunit of condensin I, a large protein complex involved in chromosome condensation.

== Interactions ==
NCAPG has been shown to interact with DNMT3B.
