= NCAPD3 =

Protein-coding gene in the species Homo sapiens

Identifiers
- Aliases: NCAPD3, CAP-D3, CAPD3, hCAP-D3, hHCP-6, hcp-6, non-SMC condensin II complex subunit D3, MCPH22
- External IDs: OMIM: 609276; MGI: 2142989; GeneCards: NCAPD3

Gene location (Human)
Chr.	Chromosome 11 (human)
Band	11q25	Start	134,150,113 bp
Band	11q25	End	134,225,504 bp

Gene location (Mouse)
Chr.	Chromosome 9 (mouse)
Band	9|9 A4	Start	26,941,471 bp
Band	9|9 A4	End	27,006,611 bp
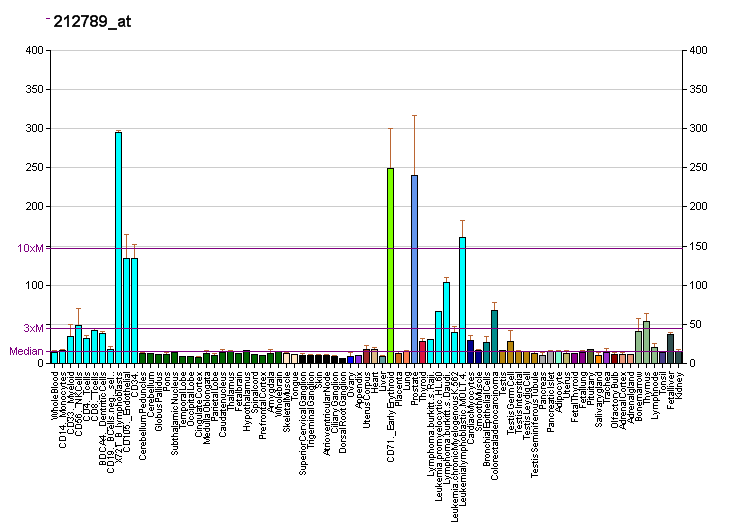
RNA expression pattern
Bgee	Human / Mouse (ortholog); Top expressed in: sural nerve; secondary oocyte; ventricular zone; gonad; prostate; ganglionic eminence; testicle; stromal cell of endometrium; right lobe of liver; left testis / Top expressed in: hand; Gonadal ridge; Paneth cell; primary oocyte; thymus; dermis; human fetus; superior cervical ganglion; neural layer of retina; abdominal wall; More reference expression data
BioGPS	More reference expression data
Gene ontology
Molecular function	methylated histone binding; chromatin binding; protein binding; histone binding
Cellular component	membrane; nucleus; condensed chromosome, centromeric region; nucleoplasm
Biological process	mitotic chromosome condensation; chromosome separation; cell division; cell cycle; chromosome condensation; meiotic chromosome condensation
Sources:Amigo / QuickGO
Orthologs
Databases	NCBI: entry; OMA: entry
Species	Human	Mouse
Entrez	23310	78658
Ensembl	ENSG00000151503	ENSMUSG00000035024
UniProt	P42695	Q6ZQK0
RefSeq (mRNA)	NM_015261; NM_001372065; NM_001372068; NM_001372069; NM_001372070	NM_178113; NM_001382847
RefSeq (protein)	NP_056076; NP_001358994; NP_001358997; NP_001358998; NP_001358999	NP_835214; NP_001369776
Location (UCSC)	Chr 11: 134.15 – 134.23 Mb	Chr 9: 26.94 – 27.01 Mb
PubMed search
- Wikidata
View/Edit Human	View/Edit Mouse

Condensin-2 complex subunit D3 (CAP-D3) also known as non-SMC condensin II complex subunit D3 (NCAPD3) is a protein that, in humans, is encoded by the NCAPD3 gene. CAP-D3 is a subunit of condensin II, a large protein complex involved in chromosome condensation.
