= Xenopus egg extract =

Cell-free system

Xenopus egg extract is a lysate that is prepared by crushing the eggs of the African clawed frog Xenopus laevis. It offers a powerful cell-free (or in vitro) system for studying various cell biological processes, including cell cycle progression, nuclear transport, DNA replication and chromosome segregation. It is also called Xenopus egg cell-free system or Xenopus egg cell-free extract.

== History ==
The first frog egg extract was reported in 1983 by Lohka and Masui. This pioneering work used eggs of the Northern leopard frog Rana pipiens to prepare an extract. Later, the same procedure was applied to eggs of Xenopus laevis, becoming popular for studying cell cycle progression and cell cycle-dependent cellular events. Extracts derived from eggs of the Japanese common toad Bufo japonicus or of the Western clawed frog Xenopus tropicalis have also been reported.

== Basics of extract preparation ==
The cell cycle of unfertilized eggs of X. laevis is arrested highly synchronously at metaphase of meiosis II. Upon fertilization, the metaphase arrest is released by the action of Ca^{2+} ions released from the endoplasmic reticulum, thereby initiating early embryonic cell cycles that alternates S phase (DNA replication) and M phase (mitosis).

=== M phase extract ===
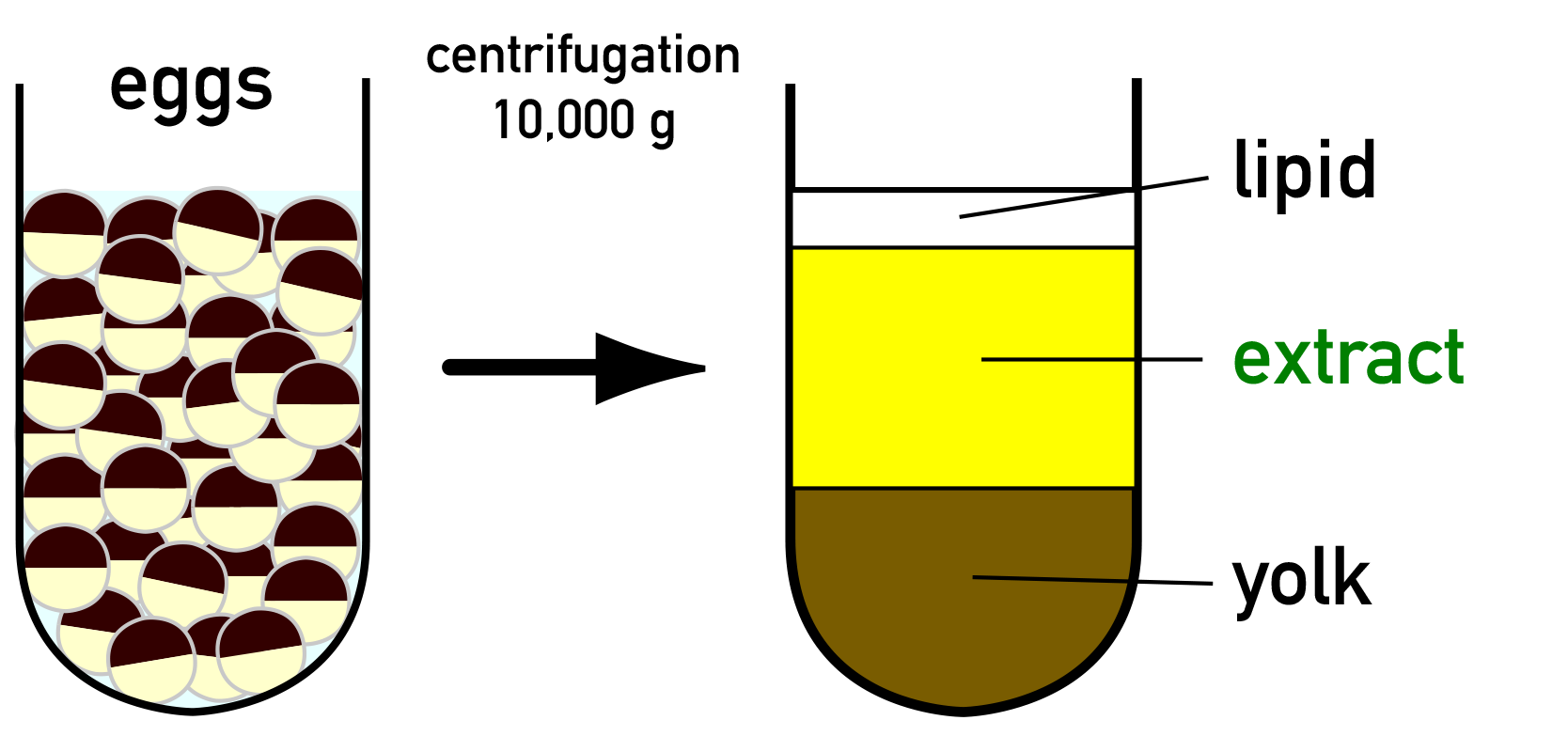
Figure 1. An egg extract is prepared by crushing X. laevis eggs by centrifugation

Unfertilized eggs in a buffer containing the Ca2+ chelator EGTA (ethylene glycol tetraacetic acid) are packed into a centrifuge tube. After removing excess buffer, the eggs are crushed by centrifugation (~10,000 g). A soluble fraction that appears between the lipid cap and the yolk is called an M phase extract. This extract contains a high level of cyclin B-Cdk1. When demembranated sperm nuclei are incubated with this extract, it undergoes a series of structural changes and is eventually converted into a set of M phase chromosomes with bipolar spindles.

=== S phase (interphase) extract ===
When CaCl₂ is added to an M-phase Xenopus egg extract at a concentration sufficient to override residual EGTA (typically several hundred micromolar), it triggers rapid inactivation of maturation promoting factor (MPF). This occurs through cyclin B degradation by the proteasome and induces cell cycle progression from metaphase to anaphase, and eventually into S phase. The resulting extract is referred to as an S-phase extract or interphase extract. Upon the addition of sperm chromatin to an S-phase extract, nuclear assembly is initiated: membrane vesicles accumulate around decondensed chromatin, fuse to form a nuclear envelope, and produce fully functional nuclei. Active nuclear transport occurs across the nuclear envelope, and DNA replication is initiated within the reconstituted nuclei. Because these extracts contain abundant mRNA and ribosomes, protein translation also takes place. Thus, this cell-free system can faithfully recapitulate many cellular events characteristic of proliferating cells. A notable exception is transcription, which does not occur in this system. This reflects the natural state of the Xenopus egg and early embryo, where transcription is largely repressed from the meiotic stages through to the blastula stage after fertilization.

== Different types of egg extract ==
=== Cycling extract ===
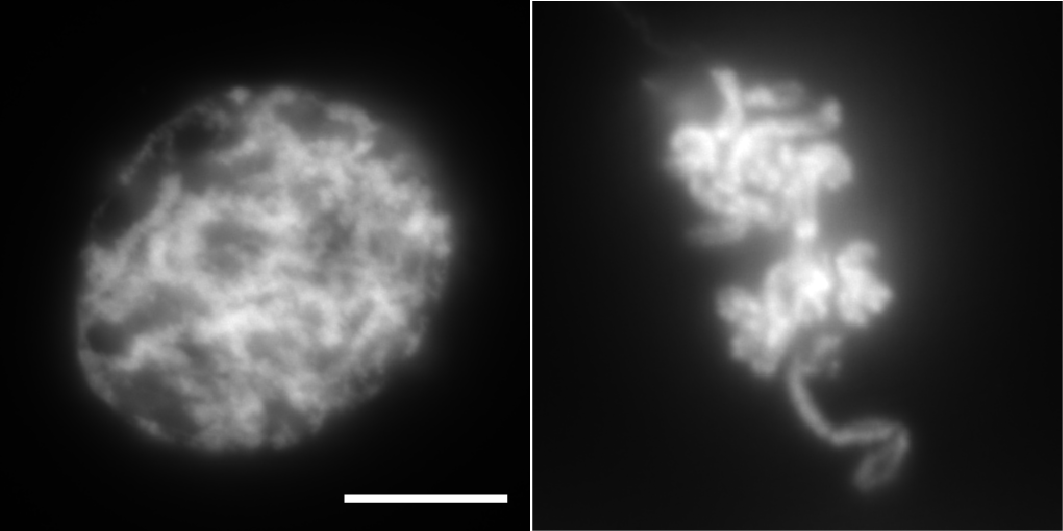
Figure 2. An interphase nucleus (left) and a cluster of mitotic chromosomes (right) produced in a cycling extract. Bar, 10 μm.

Cycling extract is a cell-free system derived from Xenopus eggs that autonomously undergoes repeated S phase and M phase cycles. It is prepared by artificially inducing intracellular responses that mimic fertilization, typically through calcium ionophore treatment or electrical stimulation of unfertilized eggs, followed by mechanical crushing of the eggs. This extract has been instrumental in elucidating fundamental mechanisms of cell cycle regulation. For example, it revealed that entry into M phase depends on the translation of cyclin B, which in turn activates maturation promoting factor (MPF). Cycling extracts are primarily used to study the regulation of cell cycle progression.

=== High-speed supernatant (HSS) ===
High-speed supernatant (HSS) is a fraction obtained by ultracentrifuging a conventional Xenopus egg extract at 100,000–200,000 × g, which removes membrane components and ribosomes, leaving a solution enriched in soluble proteins. Although HSS lacks the capacity to support nuclear assembly or protein translation, it can partially recapitulate chromatin structural changes in a cell cycle–dependent manner. It is particularly suitable for protein purification.

=== Nucleoplasmic extract (NPE) ===
Nucleoplasmic extract (NPE) is prepared from Xenopus egg extracts by first assembling nuclei in S-phase extract through the addition of a high concentration of sperm chromatin (~10,000 nuclei per μL). The reaction mixture is then centrifuged without dilution to separate the nuclei, which form a distinct layer at the top. This nuclear fraction is collected and further centrifuged at high speed, yielding a soluble supernatant (nucleoplasm) and a pellet containing nuclear membranes and chromatin. The supernatant is referred to as the nucleoplasmic extract (NPE). When DNA is pre-incubated in S-phase HSS and then NPE is added, DNA replication can be initiated without the need for nuclear envelope formation—a significant distinction from standard S-phase extract protocols, where replication initiation requires nuclear assembly. This system has enabled high-resolution analysis of replication initiation mechanisms. Moreover, NPE supports efficient replication of plasmid DNA and other non-sperm-derived templates. Leveraging this property, researchers have also used NPE to investigate DNA repair pathways using exogenously damaged DNA substrates.

== Discoveries made using egg extracts ==
- Purification of M-phase promoting factor (MPF)
- Elucidation of the role of synthesis and degradation of cyclin B in cell cycle progression
- Discovery that degradation of a protein(s) other than cyclin B is necessary for initiating chromosome segregation
- Discovery of a mechanism of spindle assembly that depends on chromatin, but not centrosomes
- Proposal of a DNA replication licensing system and identification of its responsible factor
- Identification of importin α/β responsible for nuclear transport
- Discovery of the condensin complex essential for mitotic chromosome assembly
- Identification of the cohesin complex essential for sister chromatid cohesion

More recently, the egg extracts have been used to study reprogramming of differentiated nuclei, physical properties of spindles and nuclei, and theoretical understanding of cell cycle control.

== See also ==
- Yoshio Masui
- cell cycle
- Cdk1
- cyclin
- DNA replication
- nuclear transport
- spindle apparatus
- condensin
- cohesin
