= NCAPD2 =

Protein-coding gene in the species Homo sapiens

Identifiers
- Aliases: NCAPD2, CAP-D2, CNAP1, hCAP-D2, non-SMC condensin I complex subunit D2, MCPH21
- External IDs: OMIM: 615638; MGI: 1915548; GeneCards: NCAPD2

Gene location (Human)
Chr.	Chromosome 12 (human)
Band	12p13.31	Start	6,493,356 bp
Band	12p13.31	End	6,531,955 bp

Gene location (Mouse)
Chr.	Chromosome 6 (mouse)
Band	6|6 F2- F3	Start	125,144,970 bp
Band	6|6 F2- F3	End	125,168,664 bp
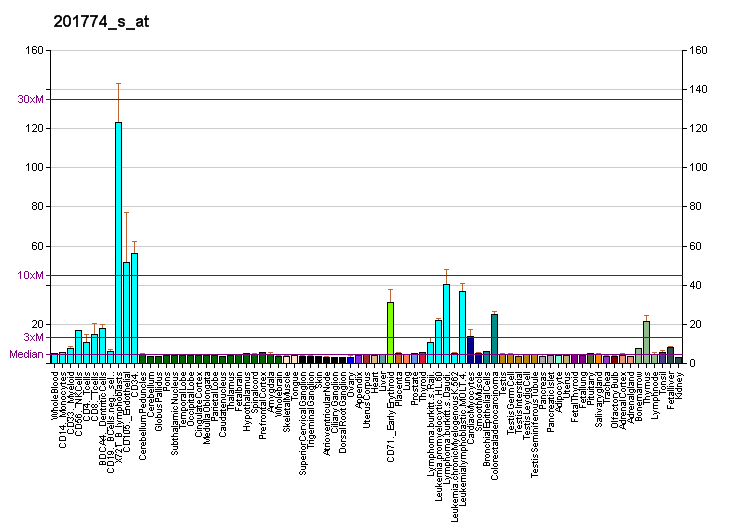
RNA expression pattern
Bgee	Human / Mouse (ortholog); Top expressed in: ventricular zone; ganglionic eminence; bone marrow cell; stromal cell of endometrium; granulocyte; rectum; epithelium of colon; gonad; Descending thoracic aorta; gastric mucosa / Top expressed in: tail of embryo; ventricular zone; genital tubercle; mandibular prominence; yolk sac; maxillary prominence; thymus; spermatocyte; epiblast; somite; More reference expression data
BioGPS	More reference expression data
Gene ontology
Molecular function	histone binding; chromatin binding; protein binding
Cellular component	cytoplasm; membrane; chromosome; nucleoplasm; condensin complex; nuclear chromosome; condensed chromosome; nucleus; condensed chromosome, centromeric region; cytosol
Biological process	mitotic chromosome condensation; meiotic chromosome condensation; cell division; chromosome separation; chromosome condensation; cell cycle; mitotic cell cycle
Sources:Amigo / QuickGO
Orthologs
Databases	NCBI: entry; OMA: entry
Species	Human	Mouse
Entrez	9918	68298
Ensembl	ENSG00000010292	ENSMUSG00000038252
UniProt	Q15021	Q8K2Z4
RefSeq (mRNA)	NM_014865	NM_146171
RefSeq (protein)	NP_055680	NP_666283
Location (UCSC)	Chr 12: 6.49 – 6.53 Mb	Chr 6: 125.14 – 125.17 Mb
PubMed search
- Wikidata
View/Edit Human	View/Edit Mouse

Condensin complex subunit 1 also known as chromosome-associated protein D2 (CAP-D2) or non-SMC condensin I complex subunit D2 (NCAPD2) or XCAP-D2 homolog is a protein that in humans is encoded by the NCAPD2 gene. CAP-D2 is a subunit of condensin I, a large protein complex involved in chromosome condensation.
