= MIS18BP1 =

Protein-coding gene in the species Homo sapiens

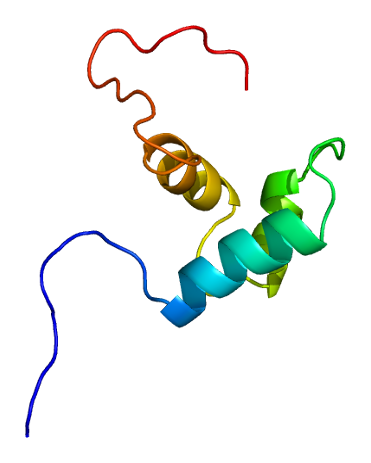

Identifiers
- Aliases: MIS18BP1, C14orf106, HSA242977, KNL2, M18BP1, MIS18 binding protein 1
- External IDs: OMIM: 618139; MGI: 2145099; GeneCards: MIS18BP1
Available structures
PDB	Ortholog search: PDBe RCSB
PDB	List of PDB id codes 1WGX

Gene location (Human)
Chr.	Chromosome 14 (human)
Band	14q21.2	Start	45,203,190 bp
Band	14q21.2	End	45,253,540 bp

Gene location (Mouse)
Chr.	Chromosome 12 (mouse)
Band	12|12 C1	Start	65,179,508 bp
Band	12|12 C1	End	65,219,378 bp
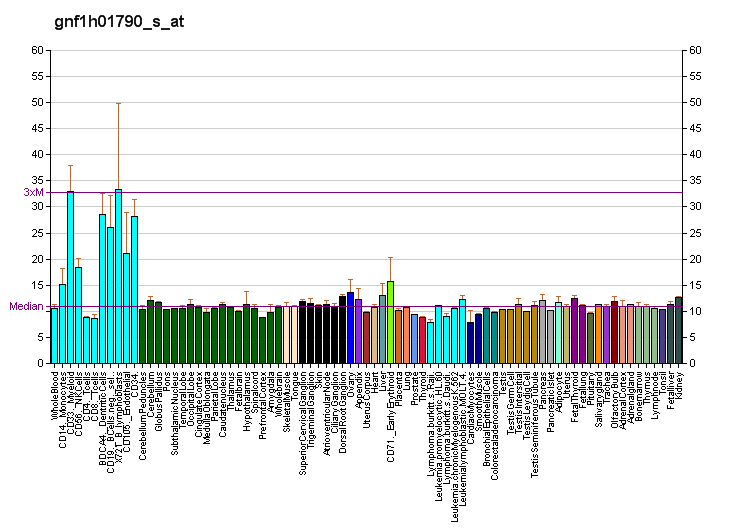

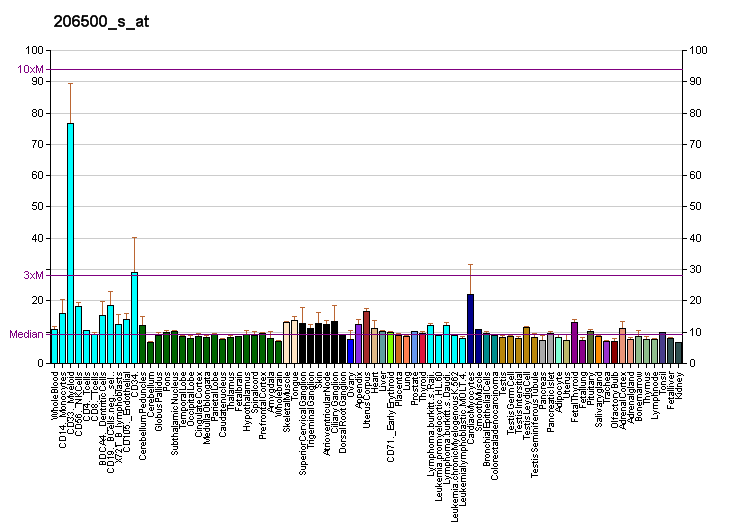
RNA expression pattern
Bgee	Human / Mouse (ortholog); Top expressed in: monocyte; ventricular zone; testicle; epithelium of colon; tendon of biceps brachii; gonad; ganglionic eminence; buccal mucosa cell; Achilles tendon; rectum / Top expressed in: genital tubercle; tail of embryo; abdominal wall; zygote; medial ganglionic eminence; primitive streak; maxillary prominence; renal corpuscle; oocyte; mandibular prominence; More reference expression data
BioGPS	More reference expression data
Gene ontology
Molecular function	DNA binding; protein binding; DNA-binding transcription factor activity, RNA polymerase II-specific
Cellular component	chromosome; chromosome, centromeric region; nucleus; nucleoplasm
Biological process	cell division; cell cycle; CENP-A containing chromatin assembly; regulation of transcription by RNA polymerase II
Sources:Amigo / QuickGO
Orthologs
Databases	NCBI: entry; OMA: entry
Species	Human	Mouse
Entrez	55320	217653
Ensembl	ENSG00000129534	ENSMUSG00000047534
UniProt	Q6P0N0	Q80WQ8
RefSeq (mRNA)	NM_018353	NM_172578
RefSeq (protein)	NP_060823	NP_766166
Location (UCSC)	Chr 14: 45.2 – 45.25 Mb	Chr 12: 65.18 – 65.22 Mb
PubMed search
- Wikidata
View/Edit Human	View/Edit Mouse

MIS18 binding protein 1 is a protein that in humans is encoded by the MIS18BP1 gene. The gene is also known as LKNL2, M18BP1, C14orf106, and HSA242977. M18BP1 protein is an important component in the CENPA deposition pathway, and in most eukaryotes M18BP1 is necessary for chromosome segregation.
