= Haemolysin expression modulating protein family =

HHA
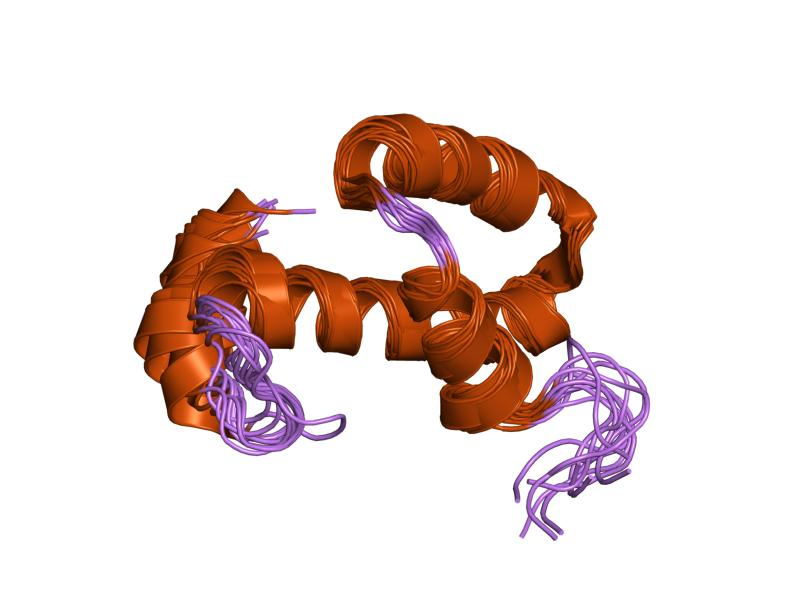
- solution structure of hemolysin expression modulating protein hha from escherichia coli. ontario centre for structural proteomics target ec0308_1_72; northeast structural genomics target et88

Identifiers
- Symbol: HHA
- Pfam: PF05321
- InterPro: IPR007985
- SCOP2: 1ir6 / SCOPe / SUPFAM
Available protein structures:
- PDB: IPR007985 PF05321 (ECOD; PDBsum)
- AlphaFold: IPR007985; PF05321

In molecular biology, the haemolysin expression modulating protein family is a family of proteins. This family consists of haemolysin expression modulating protein (Hha) from Escherichia coli and its enterobacterial homologues, such as YmoA from Yersinia enterocolitica, and RmoA encoded on the R100 plasmid. These proteins act as modulators of bacterial gene expression. Members of this family act in conjunction with members of the H-NS family, participating in the thermoregulation of different virulence factors and in plasmid transfer. Hha, along with the chromatin-associated protein H-NS, is involved in the regulation of expression of the toxin alpha-haemolysin in response to osmolarity and temperature. YmoA modulates the expression of various virulence factors, such as Yop proteins and YadA adhesin, in response to temperature. RmoA is a plasmid R100 modulator involved in plasmid transfer. The HHA family of proteins display striking similarity to the oligomerisation domain of the H-NS proteins.
