= Integration host factor =

Integration host factor subunit alpha
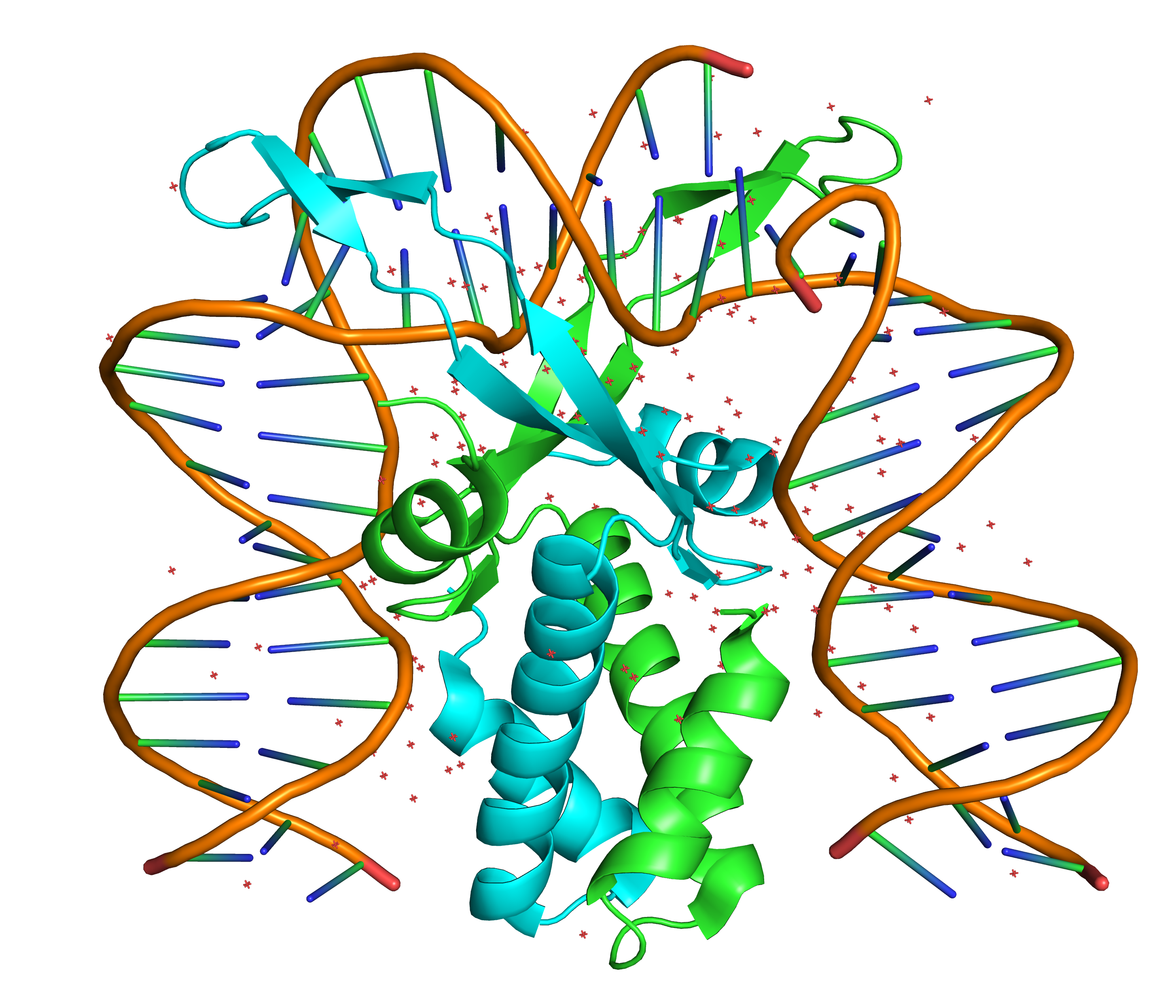
- Crystallographic structure of the heterodimeric integration host factor (IHF) complex. The alpha and beta subunits are colored cyan and green respectively while double stranded DNA is depicted as a brown cartoon.

Identifiers
- Organism: Escherichia coli K12
- Symbol: ihfA
- Entrez: 945472
- Orthologs: NCBI: entry; OMA: entry
- PDB: 1OWF
- RefSeq (Prot): NP_416227.1
- UniProt: P0A6X7

Other data
- Chromosome: Genomic: 1.8 - 1.8 Mb
Search for
- Structures: Swiss-model
- Domains: InterPro

Integration host factor subunit beta

Identifiers
- Organism: Escherichia coli K12
- Symbol: ihfB
- Entrez: 945533
- Orthologs: NCBI: entry; OMA: entry
- PDB: 1OWF
- RefSeq (Prot): NP_415432.1
- UniProt: P0A6Y1

Other data
- Chromosome: Genomic: 0.96 - 0.96 Mb
Search for
- Structures: Swiss-model
- Domains: InterPro

The integration host factor (IHF) is a bacterial DNA binding protein complex that facilitates genetic recombination, replication, and transcription by binding to specific DNA sequences and bending the DNA. It also facilitates the integration of foreign DNA into the host genome. It is a heterodimeric complex composed of two homologous subunits IHFalpha and IHFbeta.

== Protein ==
Integration Host factor is a DNA-binding/bending protein of E. coli and some of its bacteriophages. It is essential for gene regulation, site-specific recombination, and other physiological processes. It is similar to HU, a prominent binding protein, that specializes in the formation of bacterial nucleoids. In addition, IHF is composed of two subunits, himA, and himD genes. IHF is a DNA-binding protein of E. coli as well as other bacteria used to regulate genes and other physiological operations.

== Function ==
When the Integration Host Factor was first discovered, it was only known for the site-specific recombination of bacteriophage. Through further research, it was found that IHF plays a key role in the scope of physiological processes of E. Coli, including site-specific recombination activities, phage packaging and partitioning, DNA replication, and the expression of many genes. IHF is an essential protein used to replicate DNA, expression of genes, as well as phage packaging in cells.

== lambda phage salmonella mutations ==
The article discusses the transfer of genetic information from E. coli to Salmonella cells (via lambda phage) and how it can cause changes to the transduction and lysogenic phases, in some mutated Salmonella offspring. The results of these changes were the occurrence of no infectious centers and/or plaques present in mutated strains. The article also discusses the mating of E. coli and Salmonella cells using the lambda phage and the P1 pathway to deliver the genetic information from the E. coli to the Salmonella cells.

During this process the E. coli k-12 genes are transduced into the salmonella and later expressed using IHF (integrated host factors), during the lytic phase. Some of the salmonella wild type mutations had changes to their lysogenic state, when galactose+ was present. This resulted in a failure of cell lysis, even if cells were treated with mitomycin, ultraviolet light and/or even heat, many of the mutated cells could still not achieve lysis. According to a supporting article (“Genetic recombination between Escherichia and Salmonella typhimurium”). By Baron, L.S., W.F. Carey.W.M. Spilman.1959. Proc.Nat.Acad.Sci.U.S.A.45:976-984. AFalkow, S., As well as L.S.Baron.1970.(”Plasmid formation after lambda phage infection of Escherichlacolf-Salmonella typhosa hybrids”).J.Bacteriol.102:228-290.s The reason for these cells having resistant to lysis, as well as the survivability of these cells in harsh physical environments, this is due to salmonellas ability salmonella repressor synthesis, in the mutated forms of salmonella, this in turn makes the mutated strains immune from certain infection and various physical forces, which would kill non-mutated strains.

The Enterobacteria is a virus, this virus or bacteriophage infects certain bacteria. In the lambda phage, it is specifically E. coli. The wild type, having a temperate life cycle, allows the virus to exist in 2 life cycle stages, A lysogeny, and a lytic stage. During these life cycles it destroys the cell through the process of lysis, during the lysis process the offspring of the virus are released from the burst cell. Certain mutated strains of the virus enter a lytic stage, instead of lysing the cell. During this phase, they saturate the cell with the copies of the bacteriophages of an already lysed cell. The cell has a capsid (head) and a tail, the capsid carries a double-stranded DNA which carries the infectious genetic coding material. During this phase, the virus locates coding that allows it to bind to the E. coli. The bacteriophage then injects genetic material into the cell. This usually occurs in the lytic phase. After this the virus will hijack the bacterial DNA, it then uses the cell's internal structures to produce many copies of the bacteriophages, this is followed by lysis and the virus is set free to infect other cells. During the lysogenic phase, the virus may insert itself into the DNA of the bacterial DNA. The virus may then develop into a non-parthenogenetic virus, where it exists as a commensal relationship and does not harm the bacterial cell.

== HU and IHF in experimentally mutated E.coli Strains ==
HU and integration host factor function as auxiliary proteins in cleavage of phage lambda cohesive ends by terminase is an academic journal written by the Department of Molecular Genetics. In their article, they created isogenic strains of E.coli that were lacking HU or integration host factors to test whether bacteriophage would grow under these conditions.

HU and integration host factors (referred to as IHF throughout) are DNA-binding proteins that participate in several DNA replication processes. HU and IHF are both responsible for inhibiting and stimulating DNA replication in E.coli. Structurally, HU and IHF are overall similar, which allows them to be interchangeable with one another. As proven in the Journal of Bacteriology experiment’s results, the two are interchangeable in some processes, but they are not perfectly interchangeable. If a bacteriophage contains a cos site mutation or the host has a DNA gyrase mutation, IHF is required for there to be growth of the bacteriophage

The Journal of Bacteriology experiment tested multiple different things about bacteriophage growth when lacking HU or IHF or both. They found that if the phage was lacking both HU and IHF the lytic growth was restricted, and plaques were unable to form. There was also a noticeable difference in burst sizes when one was missing, compared to both of them missing. Similarly, those strains lacking HU or IHF showed that late gene transcription was reduced by 3 folds. Overall, they found that HU and IHF, having at least one of them present in bacteriophage is necessary for DNA maturation to occur.
