= HdeA family =

Family of protein

HdeA
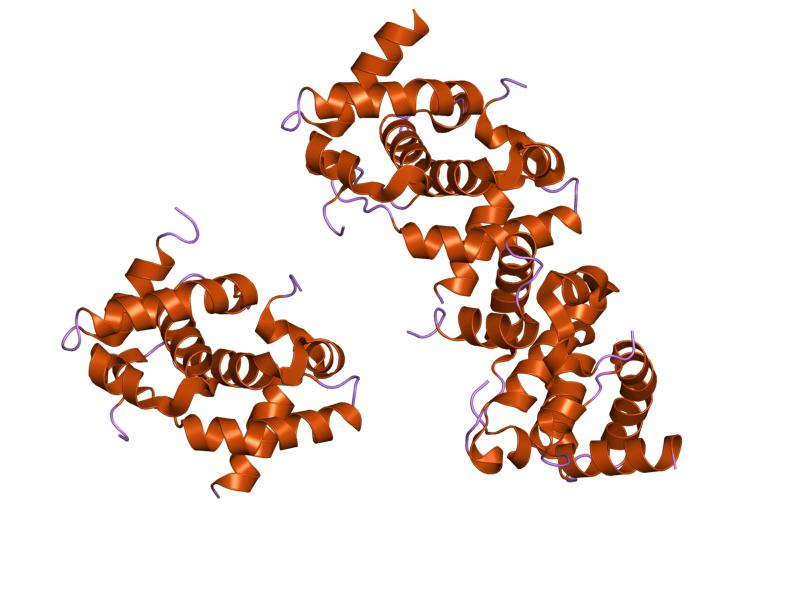
- crystal structure of e. coli periplasmic protein hdea

Identifiers
- Symbol: HdeA
- Pfam: PF06411
- InterPro: IPR010486
- SCOP2: 1bg8 / SCOPe / SUPFAM
Available protein structures:
- PDB: IPR010486 PF06411 (ECOD; PDBsum)
- AlphaFold: IPR010486; PF06411

In molecular biology, the HdeA family of proteins (HNS (histone-like nucleoid structuring)-dependent expression A) is a stress response protein family found in highly acid resistant bacteria such as Shigella flexneri and Escherichia coli, but which is lacking in mildly acid tolerant bacteria such as Salmonella. HdeA is one of the most abundant proteins found in the periplasmic space of E. coli, where it is one of a network of proteins that confer an acid resistance phenotype essential for the pathogenesis of enteric bacteria. HdeA is thought to act as a chaperone, functioning to prevent the aggregation of periplasmic proteins denatured under acidic conditions. The HNS protein, a chromatin-associated protein that influences the gene expression of several environmentally-induced target genes, represses the expression of HdeA. HdeB, which is encoded within the same operon, may form heterodimers with HdeA. HdeA is a single domain protein with an overall fold that is similar to the fold of the N-terminal subdomain of the GluRS anticodon-binding domain.
