= Bacterial DNA binding protein =

Bacteria use a variety of DNA-binding proteins, generally basic in pH. Since bacterial binding proteins have a diversity of functions, it has been difficult to develop a common function for all of them. Examples include:

- The HU protein in Escherichia coli, a dimer of closely related alpha and beta chains and in other bacteria can be a dimer of identical chains. HU-type proteins have been found in a variety of bacteria (including cyanobacteria) and archaea, and are also encoded in the chloroplast genome of some algae. They are commonly referred to as histone-like and have many similar traits with the eukaryotic histone proteins. Eukaryotic histones package DNA to help it to fit in the nucleus, and they are known to be the most conserved proteins in nature.
- The integration host factor (IHF), a dimer of closely related chains which is suggested to function in genetic recombination as well as in translational and transcriptional control is found in Enterobacteria and viral proteins including the African swine fever virus protein A104R (or LMW5-AR).

== Role in DNA replication ==
Research suggests that bacterial DNA binding protein has an important role during DNA replication; the protein is involved in stabilizing the lagging strand as well as interacting with DNA polymerase III. The role of single-stranded DNA binding (SSB) protein during DNA replication in Escherichia coli cells has been studied, specifically the interactions between SSB and the χ subunit of DNA polymerase III in environments of varying salt concentrations.

In DNA replication at the lagging strand site, DNA polymerase III removes nucleotides individually from the DNA binding protein. An unstable SSB/DNA system would result in rapid disintegration of the SSB, which stalls DNA replication. Research has shown that the ssDNA is stabilized by the interaction of SSB and the χ subunit of DNA polymerase III in E. coli, thus preparing for replication by maintaining the correct conformation that increases the binding affinity of enzymes to ssDNA. Furthermore, binding of SSB to DNA polymerase III at the replication fork prevents dissociation of SSB, consequently increasing the efficiency of DNA polymerase III to synthesize a new DNA strand.

== Examples ==
=== H-NS ===
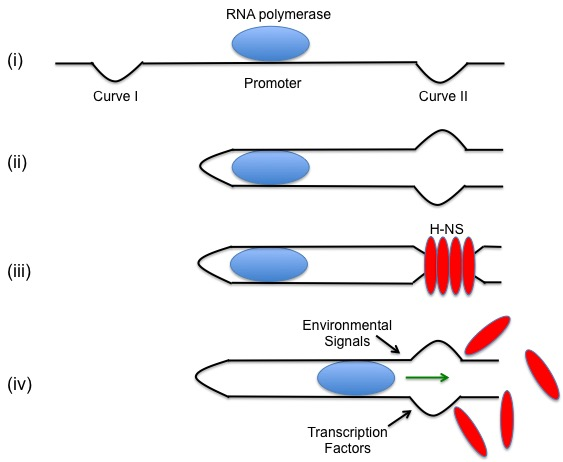
(i) RNA polymerase at the promoter is surrounded by curved DNA. (ii) This curved DNA wraps around the polymerase. (iii) H-NS binds to the curved DNA to lock the RNA polymerase at the promoter and prevents transcription from occurring. (iv) Environmental signals and transcription factors release the DNA bacterial binding protein and allows transcription to proceed.

Initially, bacterial DNA binding proteins were thought to help stabilize bacterial DNA. Currently, many more functions of bacteria DNA binding proteins have been discovered, including the regulation of gene expression by histone-like nucleoid-structuring protein, H-NS.

H-NS is about 15.6 kDa and assists in the regulation of bacterial transcription in bacteria by repressing and activating certain genes. H-NS binds to DNA with an intrinsic curvature. In E. coli, H-NS binds to a P1 promoter decreasing rRNA production during stationary and slow growth periods. RNA polymerase and H-NS DNA binding protein have overlapping binding sites; it is thought that H-NS regulates rRNA production by acting on the transcription initiation site. It has been found that H-NS and RNA polymerase both bind to the P1 promoter and form a complex. When H-NS is bound with RNA Polymerase to the promoter region, there are structural differences in the DNA that are accessible. It has also been found that H-NS can affect translation as well by binding to mRNA and causing its degradation.

=== HU ===
HU is a small (10 kDa) bacterial DNA-binding protein, which structurally differs from a eukaryotic histone but functionally acts similarly to a histone by inducing negative supercoiling into circular DNA with the assistance of topoisomerase. The protein has been implicated in DNA replication, recombination, and repair. With an α-helical hydrophobic core and two positively charged β-ribbon arms, HU binds non-specifically to dsDNA with low affinity but binds to altered DNA—such as junctions, nicks, gaps, forks, and overhangs—with high affinity. The arms bind to the minor groove of DNA in low affinity states; in high affinity states, a component of the α-helical core interacts with the DNA as well. However, this protein's function is not solely confined to DNA; HU also binds to RNA and DNA-RNA hybrids with the same affinity as supercoiled DNA.

Recent research has revealed that HU binds with high specificity to the mRNA of rpoS, a transcript for the stress sigma factor of RNA polymerase, and stimulates translation of the protein. Additional to this RNA function, it was also demonstrated that HU binds DsrA, a small non-coding RNA that regulates transcription through repressing H-NS and stimulates translation through increasing expression of rpoS. These interactions suggest that HU has multiple influences on transcription and translation in bacterial cells.

=== IHF ===
Integration host factor, IHF, is not a nucleoid-associated protein only found in gram negative bacteria. It is a 20 kDa heterodimer, composed of α and β subunits that bind to the sequence 5' - WATCAANNNNTTR - 3' and bends the DNA approximately 160 degrees. The β arms of IHF have Proline residues that help stabilize the DNA kinks. These kinks can help compact DNA and allow for supercoiling. The mode of binding to DNA depends on environmental factors, such as the concentration of ions present. With a high concentration of KCl, there is weak DNA bending. It has been found that sharper DNA bending occurs when the concentration of KCl is less than 100 mM, and IHF is not concentrated.

IHF was discovered as a necessary co-factor for recombination of λ phage into E.coli. In 2016 it was discovered that IHF also plays a key role in CRISPR type I and type II systems. It has a major role in allowing the Cas1-Cas2 complex to integrate new spacers into the CRISPR sequence. The bending of the DNA by IHF is thought to alter spacing in the DNA major and minor grooves, allowing the Cas1-Cas2 complex to make contact with the DNA bases. This is a key function in the CRISPR system as it ensures that new spacers area always added at the beginning of the CRISPR sequence next to the leader sequence. This directing of integration by IHF ensures that spacers are added chronologically, allowing better protection against the most recent viral infection.

=== Comparison ===
Table 1. Comparison of some DNA Binding Proteins
DNA Binding Protein	Size	Structure	Binding Site	Effect
H-NS	15.6 kDa	exists in dimers to physically prevent RNA polymerase from binding to promoter	binds to bent DNA, binds to P1 promoter in E. coli	regulation of gene expression
HU	10 kDa	α-helical core and two positively charged β-ribbon arms	binds non-specifically to dsDNA, binds to DsrA, a small non-coding RNA that regulates transcription	induces negative supercoiling into circular DNA
IHF	22 kDa	αβαβ hetrodimer	binds to specific sequences of DNA	creates kinks in DNA

== Implications and further research ==
The functions of bacterial DNA-binding proteins are not limited to DNA replication. Researchers have been investigating other pathways these proteins affect. The DNA-binding protein H-NS has been known to play roles in chromosome organization and gene regulation; however, recent studies have also confirmed their role in indirectly regulating flagella functions. Some motility regulatory linkages that H-NS influences include the messenger molecule Cyclic di-GMP, the bio-film regulatory protein CsgD, and the sigma factors, σ(S) and σ(F). Further studies are aiming to characterize the ways this nucleoid-organizing protein affects the motility of the cell through other regulatory pathways.

Other researchers have used bacterial DNA-binding proteins to research Salmonella enterica serovar Typhimurium, in which the T6SS genes are activated from a macrophage infection. When S. e. Typhimurium infects, their efficiency can be improved through a sense-and-kill mechanism with T6SS H-NS silencing. Assays are created that combine reporter fusions, electrophoretic mobility shift assays, DNase footprinting, and fluorescence microscopy to silence the T6SS gene cluster by the histone-like nucleoid structuring H-NS protein.

== See also ==
- DNA-binding domain
- DNA-binding protein
- DNA-binding protein from starved cells
- Transcription factor
