= Nucleoid =

Region within a prokaryotic cell containing genetic material

The nucleoid (meaning nucleus-like) is an irregularly shaped region within the prokaryotic cell that contains all or most of the genetic material. The chromosome of a typical prokaryote is circular, and its length is very large compared to the cell dimensions, so it needs to be compacted in order to fit. In contrast to the nucleus of a eukaryotic cell, it is not surrounded by a nuclear membrane. Instead, the nucleoid forms by condensation and functional arrangement with the help of chromosomal architectural proteins and RNA molecules as well as DNA supercoiling. Genome length varies widely (generally a few Mbp within a prokaryote phylum), and a cell may contain multiple copies of its genome.

Though the structure of a bacterial nucleoid has not yet been characterized in high resolution, key features have been researched in Escherichia coli as a model organism. In E. coli, the chromosomal DNA is on average negatively supercoiled and folded into plectonemic loops, which are confined to different physical regions and rarely diffuse into each other. These loops spatially organize into megabase-sized regions called macrodomains, within which DNA sites frequently interact, but between which interactions are rare. The condensed and spatially organized DNA forms a helical ellipsoid that is radially confined in the cell. The 3D structure of the DNA in the nucleoid appears to vary depending on conditions and is linked to gene expression so that the nucleoid architecture and gene transcription are tightly interdependent, influencing each other reciprocally.

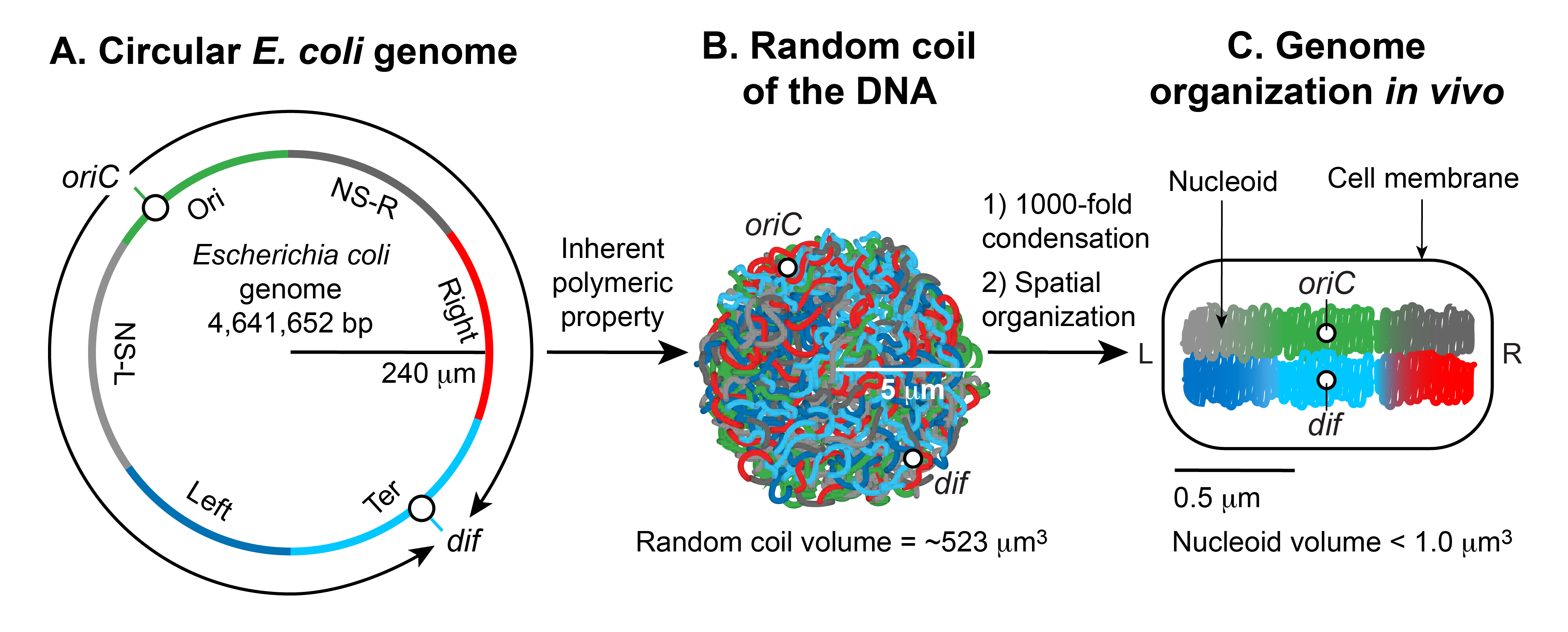
Compaction and spatial organization of the *Escherichia coli* nucleoid. (A) Structure of the relaxed circular genome An illustration of the circular 'Escherichia coli' genome in its fully opened, uncoiled form. The arrows show the two opposite directions of DNA replication (bi-directional replication). The map marks the starting point of replication ('oriC') and the 'dif' site in the replication ending zone ('ter'), where the completed DNA circles are physically unlinked (decatenated). The colors correspond to the specific DNA segments that organize into distinct cellular zones, as described in C. (B) Pure DNA behaves as a loose, random coil An illustration of how pure, circular 'E. coli' DNA naturally clumps when left alone at room temperature (thermal equilibrium). Without tight twisting (supercoils) and stabilizing cellular factors, the DNA behaves as a loose, disorganized tangle. (C) The tightly organized chromosome inside a living cell. A cartoon of the chromosome inside a newly born *E. coli* cell. The DNA is not just packed 1,000 times tighter than the loose tangle in B, but is also highly organized in space. The replication start point ('oriC') and end point ('dif') are positioned right in the middle of the cell (mid-cell). Additionally, the colored DNA segments shown in A fold into physically separate, distinct neighborhoods within the cell.

== Background ==
In many bacteria, the chromosome is a single covalently closed (circular) double-stranded DNA molecule that encodes the genetic information in a haploid (monoploid) form. The size of the DNA varies from 500,000 to several million base pairs (bp) encoding from 500 to several thousand genes depending on the organism. The chromosomal DNA is present in cells in a highly compact, organized form called the nucleoid (meaning nucleus-like), which is not encased by a nuclear membrane as in eukaryotic cells. The isolated nucleoid contains 80% DNA, 10% protein, and 10% RNA by weight.

The gram-negative bacterium Escherichia coli is a model system for nucleoid research into how chromosomal DNA becomes the nucleoid, the factors involved therein, what is known about its structure, and how some of the DNA structural aspects influence gene expression.

There are two essential aspects of nucleoid formation; condensation of a large DNA into a small cellular space and functional organization of DNA in a three-dimensional form. The haploid circular chromosome in E. coli consists of ~ 4.6 million bp. If DNA is relaxed in the B form, it would have a circumference of ~1.5 millimeters (0.332 nm × 4.6 million). However, a large DNA molecule such as the E. coli chromosomal DNA does not remain a straight rigid molecule in a suspension. Brownian motion will generate curvature and bends in DNA. The maximum length up to which a double-helical DNA remains straight by resisting the bending enforced by Brownian motion is ~50 nm or 150 bp, which is called the persistence length. Thus, pure DNA becomes substantially condensed without any additional factors; at thermal equilibrium, it assumes a random coil form. The random coil of E. coli chromosomal DNA would occupy a volume (4/3 π r^{3}) of ~ 523 μm^{3}, calculated from the radius of gyration (R_{g} = (√N a)/√6) where a is the Kuhn length (2 × persistence length), and N is the number of Kuhn length segments in the DNA (total length of the DNA divided by a). Although DNA is already condensed in the random coil form, it still cannot assume the volume of the nucleoid which is less than a micron. Thus, the inherent property of DNA is not sufficient: additional factors must help condense DNA further on the order of ~10^{3} (volume of the random coil divided by the nucleoid volume). The second essential aspect of nucleoid formation is the functional arrangement of DNA. Chromosomal DNA is not only condensed but also functionally organized in a way that is compatible with DNA transaction processes such as replication, recombination, segregation, and transcription. Almost five decades of research beginning in 1971, has shown that the final form of the nucleoid arises from a hierarchical organization of DNA. At the smallest scale (1 kb or less), nucleoid-associated DNA architectural proteins condense and organize DNA by bending, looping, bridging or wrapping DNA. At a larger scale (10 kb or larger), DNA forms plectonemic loops, a braided form of DNA induced by supercoiling. At the megabase scale, the plectonemic loops coalesce into six spatially organized domains (macrodomains), which are defined by more frequent physical interactions among DNA sites within the same macrodomain than between different macrodomains. Long- and short-range DNA-DNA connections formed within and between the macrodomains contribute to condensation and functional organization. Finally, the nucleoid is a helical ellipsoid with regions of highly condensed DNA at the longitudinal axis.

== Condensation and organization ==
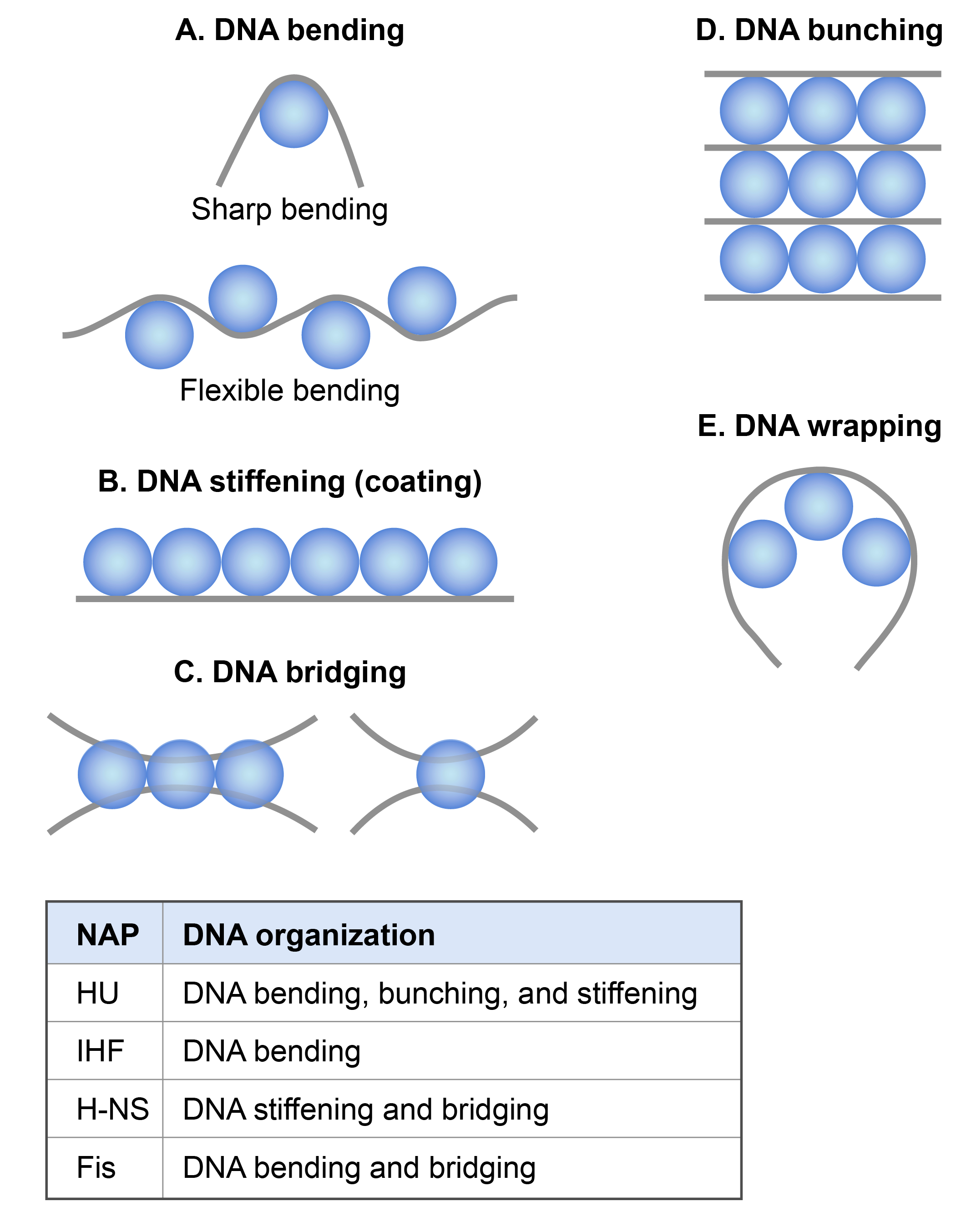
Nucleoid at ≥1 kb scale. DNA organization by nucleoid-associated proteins. DNA is depicted as a grey straight or curved line and the nucleoid-associated proteins are depicted as blue spheres.

=== Nucleoid-associated proteins (NAPs) ===
In eukaryotes, genomic DNA is condensed in the form of a repeating array of DNA-protein particles called nucleosomes.

A nucleosome consists of ~146 bp of DNA wrapped around an octameric complex of the histone proteins. Although bacteria do not have histones, they possess a group of DNA binding proteins referred to as nucleoid-associated proteins (NAPs) that are functionally analogous to histones in a broad sense. NAPs are highly abundant and constitute a significant proportion of the protein component of nucleoid.

A distinctive characteristic of NAPs is their ability to bind DNA in both a specific (either sequence- or structure-specific) and non-sequence specific manner. As a result, NAPs are dual function proteins. The specific binding of NAPs is mostly involved in gene-specific transcription, DNA replication, recombination, and repair. At the peak of their abundance, the number of molecules of many NAPs is several orders of magnitude higher than the number of specific binding sites in the genome. Therefore, it is reasoned that NAPs bind to the chromosomal DNA mostly in the non-sequence specific mode and it is this mode that is crucial for chromosome compaction. Non-sequence specific binding of a NAP may not be completely random; there could be low-sequence specificity and or structural specificity due to sequence-dependent DNA conformation or DNA conformation created by other NAPs.

Although molecular mechanisms of how NAPs condense DNA in vivo are not well understood, based on the extensive in vitro studies it appears that NAPs participate in chromosome compaction via the following mechanisms: NAPs induce and stabilize bends in DNA, thus aid in DNA condensation by reducing the persistence length. NAPs condense DNA by bridging, wrapping, and bunching that could occur between nearby DNA segments or distant DNA segments of the chromosome. Another mechanism by which NAPs participate in chromosome compaction is by constraining negative supercoils in DNA thus contributing to the topological organization of the chromosome.

There are at least 12 NAPs identified in E. coli, the most extensively studied of which are HU, IHF, H-NS, and Fis. Their abundance and DNA binding properties and effect on DNA condensation and organization are summarized in the tables below.

Properties and the abundance of major nucleoid-associated proteins of E. coli
Protein	Molecular mass (kDa)	Native functional unit	Abundance^{1} in growth phase	Abundance^{1} in stationary phase
HUα and HUβ	~ 9	Homo- and hetero-dimer	55,000 (23)	30,000 (12.5)
IHFα and IHFβ	~ 11	Heterodimer	12,000 (5)	55,000 (23)
H-NS	~ 15	Homodimer	20,000 (8)	15,000 (6)
Fis	~ 11	Homodimer	60,000 (25)	Undetectable
Dps	~ 19	Dodecamer	6,000 (0.4)	180,000 (12.5)

^{1} Abundance (molecules/cell) data were taken from; The number in the parenthesis is micromolar concentration calculated using the following formula: (number of native functional units/Avogadro number) × (1/cell volume in liter) × 10^{3}. Cell volume in liter ( 2 × 10^{−15}) was determined by assuming volume of the E. coli cell to be 2 μm^{3}.

DNA binding properties of nucleoid-associated DNA architectural protein of E. coli
Protein	Binding motif	Specific DNA binding affinity^{1}	Random DNA binding affinity^{1}
HU	A structural motif defined by bends and kinks in DNA	7.5 × 10^{−9}	4.0 × 10^{−7}
IHF	WATCAANNNNTTR	1.5 × 10^{−9}	1.7 × 10^{−6}
H-NS	TCGATAAATT	10-15 × 10^{−9}	6 × 10^{−8}
Fis	GNTYAAAWTTTRANC	0.2-1.0 × 10^{−9}	>8.0 × 10^{−6}
Dps	ND	ND	1.65 × 10^{−7}
MatP	GTGACRNYGTCAC	8.0 × 10^{−9}	ND
MukBEF	ND	ND	ND

^{1} Binding affinity refers to equilibrium dissociation constant (Kd) in molar units (M). ND = not determined

==== HU ====
Histone-like protein from E. coli strain U93 (HU) is an evolutionarily conserved protein in bacteria. HU exists in E. coli as homo- and heterodimers of two subunits HUα and HUβ sharing 69% amino acid identity. Although it is referred to as a histone-like protein, close functional relatives of HU in eukaryotes are high-mobility group (HMG) proteins, and not histones. HU is a non-sequence specific DNA binding protein. It binds with low-affinity to any linear DNA. However, it preferentially binds with high-affinity to a structurally distorted DNA. Examples of distorted DNA substrates include cruciform DNA, bulged DNA, dsDNA containing a single-stranded break such as nicks, gaps, or forks. Furthermore, HU specifically binds and stabilizes a protein-mediated DNA loop. In the structurally specific DNA binding mode, HU recognizes a common structural motif defined by bends or kinks created by distortion, whereas it binds to a linear DNA by locking the phosphate backbone. While the high-affinity structurally-specific binding is required for specialized functions of HU such as site-specific recombination, DNA repair, DNA replication initiation, and gene regulation, it appears that the low-affinity general binding is involved in DNA condensation. In chromatin-immunoprecipitation coupled with DNA sequencing (ChIP-Seq), HU does not reveal any specific binding events. Instead, it displays a uniform binding across the genome presumably reflecting its mostly weak, non-sequence specific binding, thus masking the high-affinity binding in vivo.

In strains lacking HU, the nucleoid is "decondensed", consistent with a role of HU in DNA compaction. The following in vitro studies suggest possible mechanisms of how HU might condense and organize DNA in vivo. Not only HU stably binds to distorted DNA with bends, it induces flexible bends even in a linear DNA at less than 100 nM concentration. In contrast, HU shows the opposite architectural effect on DNA at higher physiologically relevant concentrations. It forms rigid nucleoprotein filaments causing the straitening of DNA and not the bending. The filaments can further form a DNA network (DNA bunching) expandable both laterally and medially because of the HU-HU multimerization triggered by the non-sequence-specific DNA binding.

How are these behaviors of HU relevant inside the cell? The formation of filaments requires high-density binding of HU on DNA, one HU dimer per 9-20 bp DNA. But there is only one HU dimer every ~150 bp of the chromosomal DNA based on the estimated abundance of 30,000 HU dimers per cell (4600000 bp /30,000). This indicates that the flexible bends are more likely to occur in vivo. The flexible bending would cause condensation due to a reduction in the persistence length of DNA as shown by magnetic tweezers experiments, which allow studying condensation of a single DNA molecule by a DNA binding protein. However, because of the cooperativity, the rigid filaments and networks could form in some regions in the chromosome. The filament formation alone does not induce condensation, but DNA networking or bunching can substantially contribute to condensation by bringing distant or nearby chromosome segments together.

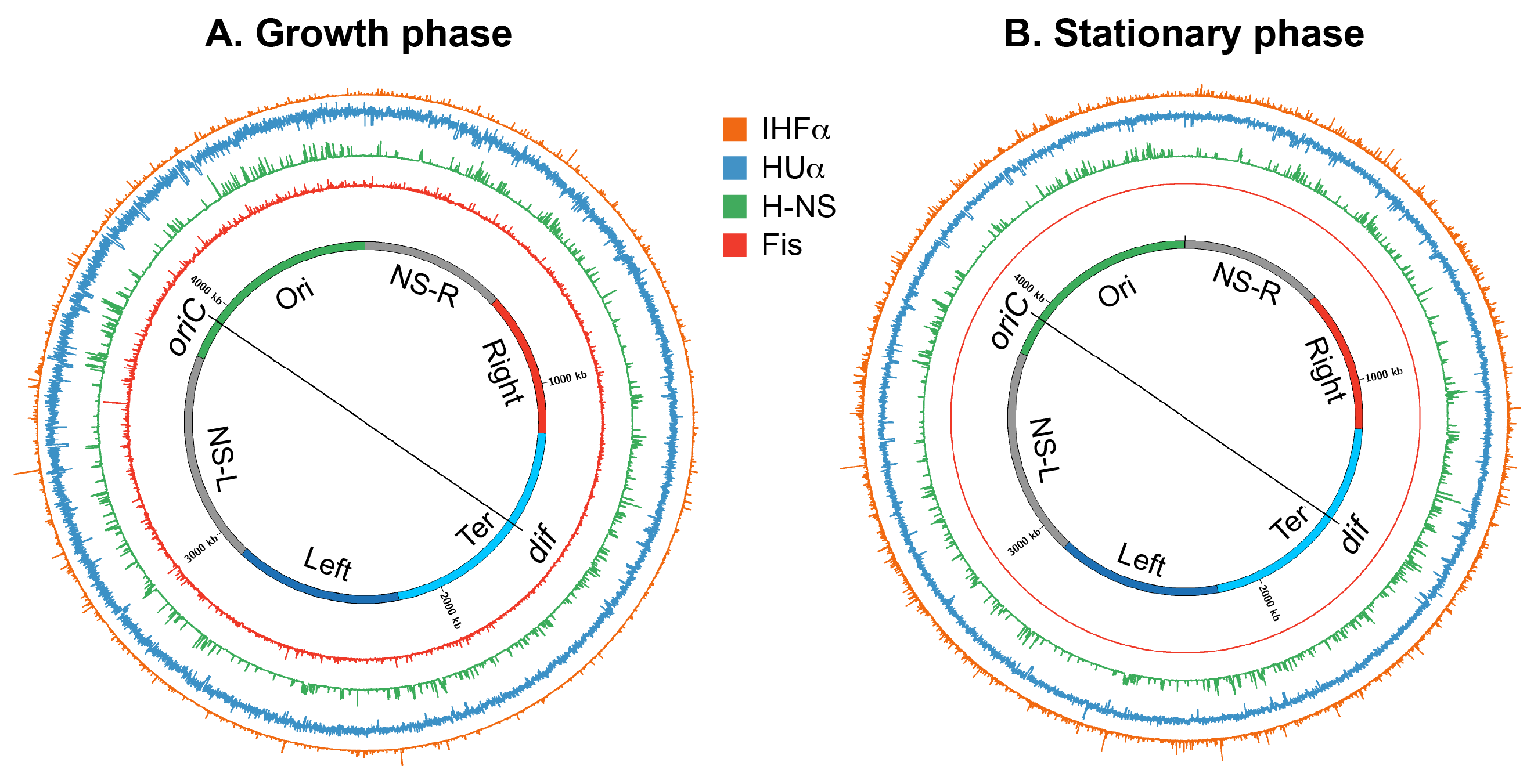
Genome-wide occupancy of nucleoid-associated proteins of E. coli. A circular layout of the E. coli genome depicting genome-wide occupancy of NAPs Fis, H-NS, HU, and IHF in growth and stationary phases in E. coli. Histogram plots of the genome occupancy of NAPs as determined by chromatin-immunoprecipitation coupled with DNA sequencing (ChIP-seq) are shown outside the circular genome. The bin size of the histograms is 300 bp. Figure prepared in circos/0.69-6 using the ChIP-Seq data from.

==== IHF ====
Integration host factor (IHF) is structurally almost identical to HU but behaves differently from HU in many aspects. Unlike HU, which preferentially binds to a structural motif regardless of the sequence, IHF preferentially binds to a specific DNA sequence even though the specificity arises through the sequence-dependent DNA structure and deformability. The specific binding of IHF at cognate sites bends DNA sharply by >160-degree. An occurrence of the cognate sequence motif is about 3000 in the E. coli genome. The estimated abundance of IHF in the growth phase is about 6000 dimers per cell. Assuming that one IHF dimer binds to a single motif and nucleoid contains more than one genome equivalent during the exponential growth phase, most of the IHF molecules would occupy specific sites in the genome and likely only condense DNA by inducing sharp bending.

Besides preferential binding to a specific DNA sequence, IHF also binds to DNA in a non-sequence specific manner with the affinities similar to HU. A role of the non-specific binding of IHF in DNA condensation appears to be critical in the stationary phase because the IHF abundance increases by five-fold in the stationary phase and the additional IHF dimers would likely bind the chromosomal DNA non-specifically. Unlike HU, IHF does not form thick rigid filaments at higher concentrations. Instead, its non-specific binding also induces DNA bending albeit the degree of bending is much smaller than that at specific sites and is similar to the flexible bending induced by HU in a linear DNA at low concentrations. In vitro, the bending induced by non-specific binding of IHF can cause DNA condensation and promotes the formation of higher-order nucleoprotein complexes depending on the concentrations of potassium chloride and magnesium chloride. The higher-order DNA organization by IHF in vivo is as yet unclear.

==== H-NS ====
A distinguishable feature of histone-like or heat-stable nucleoid structuring protein (H-NS) from other NAPs is the ability to switch from the homodimeric form at relatively low concentrations (<1 × 10^{−5} M) to an oligomeric state at higher levels. Because of oligomerization properties, H-NS spreads laterally along AT-rich DNA in a nucleation reaction, where high-affinity sites function as nucleation centers. The spreading of H-NS on DNA results in two opposite outcomes depending on the magnesium concentration in the reaction. At low magnesium concentration (< 2 mM), H-NS forms rigid nucleoprotein filaments whereas it forms inter- and intra-molecular bridges at higher magnesium concentrations (> 5 mM). The formation of rigid filaments results in straightening of DNA with no condensation whereas the bridging causes substantial DNA folding. Analysis of H-NS binding in the genome by ChIP-Seq assays provided indirect evidence for the spreading of H-NS on DNA in vivo. H-NS binds selectively to 458 regions in the genome. Although H-NS has been demonstrated to prefer curved DNA formed by repeated A-tracks in DNA sequences the basis of the selective binding is the presence of a conserved sequence motif found in AT-rich regions. More importantly, the frequent occurrence of the sequence motif within an H-NS binding region that can re-enforce the cooperative protein-protein interactions, and the unusually long length of the binding region are consistent with the spreading of the protein. Whether the filament formation or DNA bridging is prevalent in vivo depends on the physiological concentration of magnesium inside the cell. If the magnesium concentration is uniformly low (< 5 mM), H-NS would form rigid nucleoprotein filaments in vivo. Alternatively, if there is an uneven distribution of magnesium in the cell, it could promote both DNA bridging and stiffening but in different regions of the nucleoid.

Furthermore, H-NS is best known as a global gene silencer that preferentially inhibits transcription of horizontally transferred genes and it is the rigid filament that leads to gene silencing. Taken together, it appears that the formation of rigid filaments is the most likely outcome of H-NS-DNA interactions in vivo that leads to gene silencing but does not induce DNA condensation. Consistently, the absence of H-NS does not change the nucleoid volume. However, it is possible that E. coli experiences high-magnesium concentration under some environmental conditions. In such conditions, H-NS can switch from its filament inducing form to the bridge inducing form that contributes to DNA condensation and organization.

==== Fis ====
Factor for Inversion Stimulation (Fis) is a sequence specific DNA binding protein that binds to specific DNA sequences containing a 15-bp symmetric motif. Like IHF, Fis induces DNA bending at cognate sites. The ability to bend DNA is apparent in the structure of Fis homodimer. A Fis homodimer possesses two helix-turn-helix (HTH) motifs, one from each monomer. An HTH motif typically recognizes the DNA major groove. However, the distance between the DNA recognition helices of the two HTH motifs in the Fis homodimer is 25 Å, that is ~ 8 Å shorter than the pitch of a canonical B-DNA, indicating that the protein must bend or twist DNA to bind stably. Consistently, the crystal structure of Fis-DNA complexes shows that the distance between the recognition helices remains unchanged whereas DNA curves in the range of 60-75 degree. There are 1464 Fis binding regions distributed across the E. coli genome and a binding motif, identified computationally, matches with the known 15-bp motif. Specific binding of Fis at such sites would induce bends in DNA, thus contribute to DNA condensation by reducing persistence length of DNA. Furthermore, many Fis binding sites occur in tandem such as those in the stable RNA promoters, e.g., P1 promoter of rRNA operon rrnB. The coherent bending by Fis at the tandem sites is likely to create a DNA micro-loop that can further contribute to DNA condensation.

Besides high-affinity specific binding to cognate sites, Fis can bind to a random DNA sequence. The non-specific DNA binding is significant because Fis is as abundant as HU in the growth phase. Therefore, most of Fis molecules are expected to bind DNA in a non-sequence specific manner. Magnetic tweezers experiments show that this non-specific binding of Fis can contribute to DNA condensation and organization. Fis causes mild condensation of a single DNA molecule at <1 mM, but induces substantial folding through the formation of DNA loops of an average size of ~800 bp at >1 mM. The loops in magnetic tweezers experiments are distinct from the micro-loops created by coherent DNA bending at cognate sites, as they require the formation of high-density DNA-protein complexes achieved by sequence-independent binding. Although, occurrence of such loops in vivo remains to be demonstrated, high-density binding of Fis may occur in vivo through concerted action of both specific and non-specific binding. The in-tandem occurrence of specific sites might initiate a nucleation reaction similar to that of H-NS, and then non-specific binding would lead to the formation of localized high-density Fis arrays. The bridging between these localized regions can create large DNA loops. Fis is exclusively present in the growth phase and not in the stationary phase. Thus, any role in chromosomal condensation by Fis must be specific to growing cells.

=== Nucleoid-associated RNAs (naRNAs) ===
Early studies examining the effect of RNase A treatment on isolated nucleoids indicated that RNA participated in the stabilization of the nucleoid in the condensed state. Moreover, treatment with RNase A disrupted the DNA fibers into thinner fibers, as observed by an atomic force microscopy of the nucleoid using the "on-substrate lysis procedure". These findings demonstrated the participation of RNA in the nucleoid structure, but the identity of the RNA molecule(s) remained unknown until recently. Most of the studies on HU focused on its DNA binding. However, HU also binds to dsRNA and RNA-DNA hybrids with a lower affinity similar to that with a linear dsDNA. Moreover, HU preferentially binds to RNA containing secondary structures and an RNA-DNA hybrid in which the RNA contains a nick or overhang. The binding affinities of HU with these RNA substrates are similar to those with which it binds to distorted DNA. An immunoprecipitation of HU-bound RNA coupled to reverse transcription and microarray (RIP-Chip) study as well as an analysis of RNA from purified intact nucleoids identified nucleoid-associated RNA molecules that interact with HU. Several of them are non-coding RNAs, and one such RNA named naRNA4 (nucleoid-associated RNA 4), is encoded in a repetitive extragenic palindrome (REP325). In a strain lacking REP325, the nucleoid is decondensed as it is in a strain lacking HU. naRNA4 most likely participate in DNA condensation by connecting DNA segments in the presence of HU. Recent studies provide insights into the molecular mechanism of how naRNA4 establishes DNA-DNA connections. The RNA targets regions of DNA containing cruciform structures and forms an RNA-DNA complex that is critical for establishing DNA-DNA connections. Surprisingly, although HU helps in the formation of the complex, it is not present in the final complex, indicating its potential role as a catalyst (chaperone). The nature of the RNA-DNA complex remains puzzling because the formation of the complex does not involve extensive Watson/Crick base pairing but is sensitive to RNase H, which cleaves RNA in an RNA-DNA hybrid and the complex binds to an antibody specific to RNA-DNA hybrids.

=== Supercoiling ===
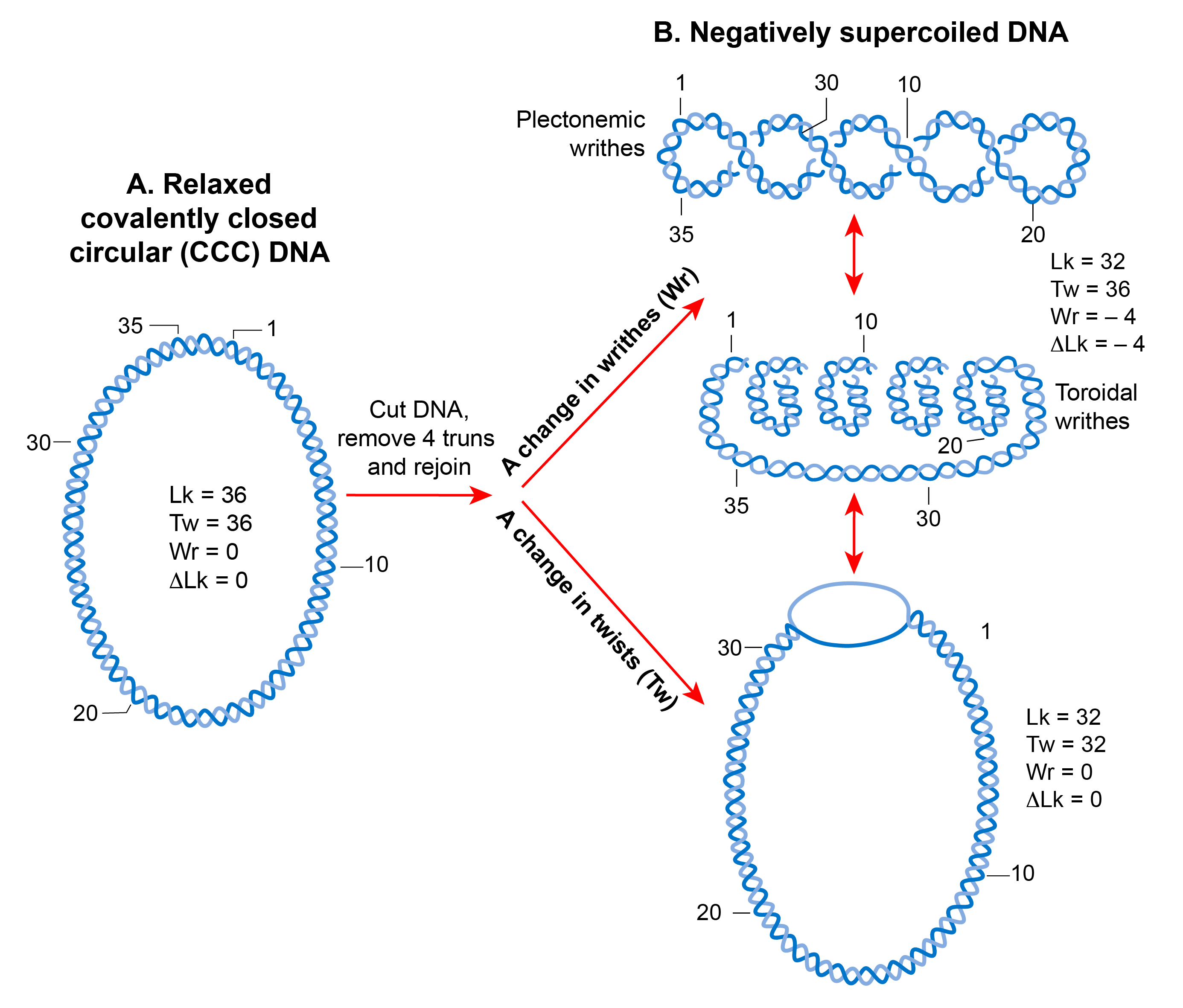
DNA supercoiling A. A linear double-stranded DNA becomes a topologically constrained molecule if the two ends are covalently joined, forming a circle. Rules of DNA topology are explained using such a molecule (ccc-DNA) in which a numerical parameter called the linking number (Lk) defines the topology. Lk is a mathematical sum of two geometric parameters, twist (Tw) and writhe (Wr). A twist is the crossing of two strands, and writhe is coiling of the DNA double helix on its axis that requires bending. Lk is always an integer and remains invariant no matter how much the two strands are deformed. It can only be changed by introducing a break in one or both DNA strands by DNA metabolic enzymes called topoisomerases. B. A torsional strain created by a change in Lk of a relaxed, topologically constrained DNA manifests in the form of DNA supercoiling. A decrease in Lk (Lk<Lk_{0}) induces negative supercoiling whereas an increase in Lk (Lk>Lk_{0}) induces positive supercoiling. Only negative supercoiling is depicted here. For example, if a cut is introduced into a ccc-DNA and four turns are removed before rejoining the two strands, the DNA becomes negatively supercoiled with a decrease in the number of twists or writhe or both. Writhe can adopt two types of geometric structures called plectoneme and toroid. Plectonemes are characterized by the interwinding of the DNA double helix and an apical loop, whereas spiraling of DNA double helix around an axis forms toroids.

Because of its helical structure, a double-stranded DNA molecule becomes topologically constrained in the covalently closed circular form which eliminates the rotation of the free ends. The number of times the two strands cross each other in a topologically constrained DNA is called the linking number (Lk), which is equivalent to the number of helical turns or twists in a circular molecule. The Lk of a topological DNA remains invariant, no matter how the DNA molecule is deformed, as long as neither strand is broken.

The Lk of DNA in the relaxed form is defined as Lk_{0}. For any DNA, Lk_{0} can be calculated by dividing the length (in bp) of the DNA by the number of bp per helical turn. This is equal to 10.4 bp for the relaxed B-form DNA. Any deviation from Lk_{0} causes supercoiling in DNA. A decrease in the linking number (Lk<Lk_{0}) creates negative supercoiling whereas an increase in the linking number (Lk>Lk_{0}) creates positive supercoiling.

The supercoiled state (when Lk is not equal to Lk_{0}) results in a transition in DNA structure that can manifest as a change in the number of twists (negative <10.4 bp/turn, positive >10.4 bp per turn) and/or in the formation of writhes, called supercoils. Thus, Lk is mathematically defined as a sign dependent sum of the two geometric parameters, twist and writhe. A quantitative measure of supercoiling that is independent of the size of DNA molecules is the supercoiling density (σ) where σ =∆Lk/Lk_{0}.

Writhes can adopt two structures; plectoneme and solenoid or toroid. A plectonemic structure arises from the interwinding of the helical axis. Toroidal supercoils originate when DNA forms several spirals, around an axis and not intersecting with each other, like those in a telephone cord. The writhes in the plectonemes form are right- and left-handed in positively or negatively supercoiled DNA, respectively. The handedness of the toroidal supercoils is opposite to those of plectonemes. Both plectonemes and toroidal supercoils can be either in a free form or restrained in a bound form with proteins. The best example of the bound toroidal supercoiling in biology is the eukaryotic nucleosome in which DNA wraps around histones.

=== Plectonemic supercoils in E. coli ===
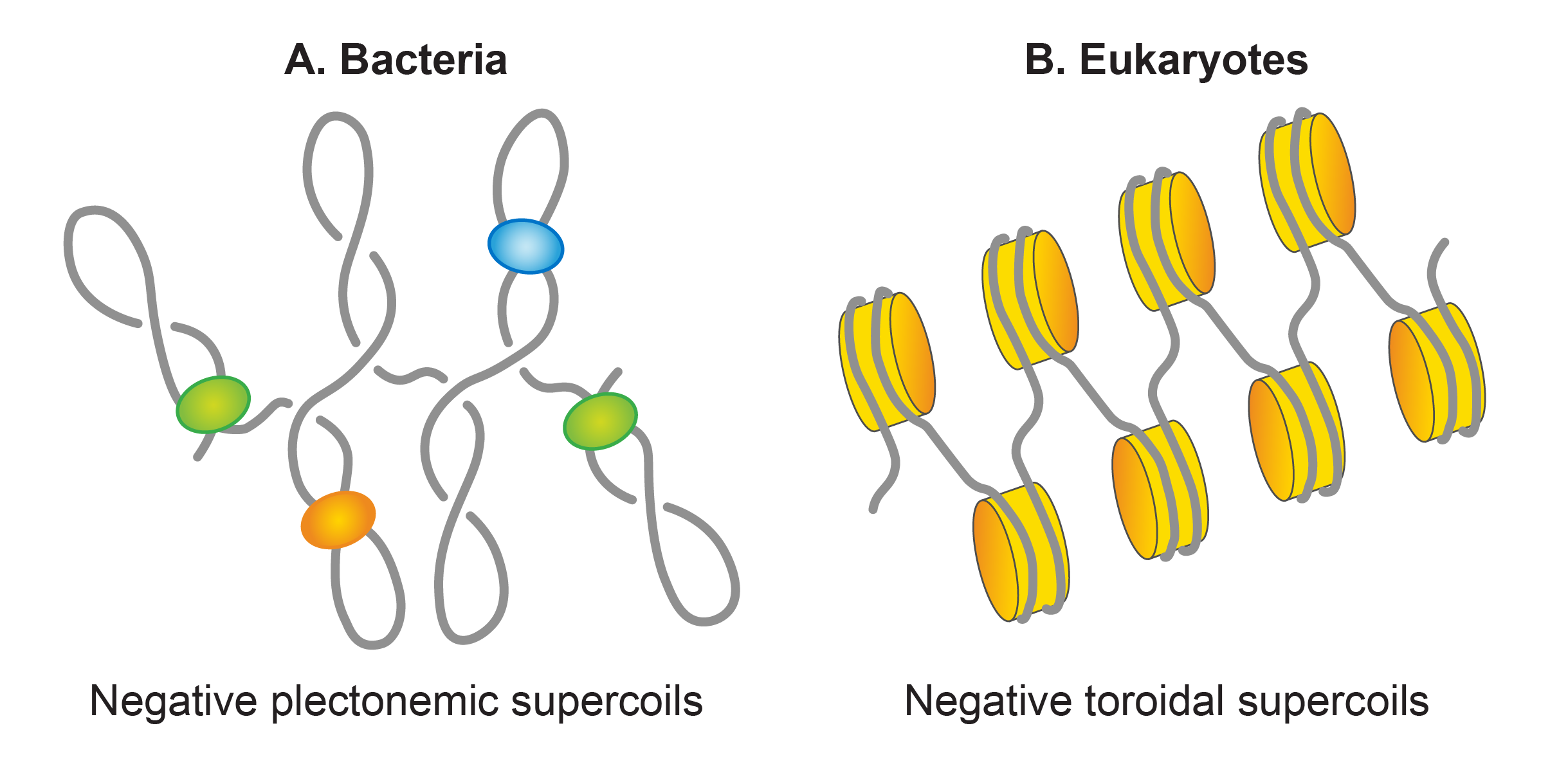
Basic units of genomic organization in bacteria and eukaryotes Genomic DNA, depicted as a grey line, is negatively supercoiled in both bacteria and eukaryotes. However, the negatively supercoiled DNA is organized in the plectonemic form in bacteria, whereas it is organized in the toroidal form in eukaryotes. Nucleoid associated proteins (NAPs), shown as colored spheres, restrain half of the plectonemic supercoils, whereas almost all of the toroidal supercoils are induced as well as restrained by nucleosomes (colored orange), formed by wrapping of DNA around histones.

In most bacteria, DNA is present in supercoiled form. The circular nature of the E. coli chromosome makes it topologically constrained molecule that is mostly negatively supercoiled with an estimated average supercoiling density (σ) of -0.05. In the eukaryotic chromatin, DNA is found mainly in the toroidal form that is restrained and defined by histones through the formation of nucleosomes. In contrast, in the E. coli nucleoid, about half of the chromosomal DNA is organized in the form of free, plectonemic supercoils. The remaining DNA is restrained in either the plectonemic form or alternative forms, including but not limited to the toroidal form, by interaction with proteins such as NAPs. Thus, plectonemic supercoils represent effective supercoiling of the E. coli genome that is responsible for its condensation and organization. Both plectonemic and toroidal supercoiling aid in DNA condensation. Branching of plectonemic structures provides less DNA condensation than does the toroidal structure. A same size DNA molecule with equal supercoiling densities is more compact in a toroidal form than in a plectonemic form. In addition to condensing DNA, supercoiling aids in DNA organization. It promotes disentanglement of DNA by reducing the probability of catenation. Supercoiling also helps bring two distant sites of DNA in proximity thereby promoting a potential functional interaction between different segments of DNA.

==== Sources of supercoiling in E. coli ====
Three factors contribute to generating and maintaining chromosomal DNA supercoiling in E. coli: (i) activities of topoisomerases, (ii) the act of transcription, and (iii) NAPs.

===== Topoisomerases =====
Topoisomerases are a particular category of DNA metabolic enzymes that create or remove supercoiling by breaking and then re-ligating DNA strands. E. coli possesses four topoisomerases. DNA gyrase introduces negative supercoiling in the presence of ATP and it removes positive supercoiling in the absence of ATP. Across all forms of life, DNA gyrase is the only topoisomerase that can create negative supercoiling and it is because of this unique ability that bacterial genomes possess free negative supercoils; DNA gyrase is found in all bacteria but absent from higher eukaryotes. In contrast, Topo I opposes DNA gyrase by relaxing the negatively supercoiled DNA. There is genetic evidence to suggest that a balance between the opposing activities of DNA gyrase and Topo I are responsible for maintaining a steady-state level of average negative superhelicity in E. coli. Both enzymes are essential for E. coli survival. A null strain of topA, the gene encoding Topo I, survives only because of the presence of suppressor mutations in the genes encoding DNA gyrase. These mutations result in reduced gyrase activity, suggesting that excess negative supercoiling due to the absence of Topo I is compensated by reduced negative supercoiling activity of DNA gyrase. Topo III is dispensable in E. coli and is not known to have any role in supercoiling in E. coli. The primary function of Topo IV is to resolve sister chromosomes. However, it has been shown to also contribute to the steady-state level of negative supercoiling by relaxing negative supercoiling together with Topo I.

E. coli DNA topoisomerases
Topoisomerase	Type	Function	Single- or double-stranded cleavage
Topoisomerase I	IA	Removes (-) supercoiling	SS
Topoisomerase III	IA	Removes (-) supercoiling	SS
Topoisomerase IV	IIA	Removes (-) supercoiling	DS
DNA gyrase	IIA	Creates (-) supercoiling and removes (+) supercoiling	DS

===== Transcription =====
A twin supercoiling domain model proposed by Liu and Wang argued that unwinding of DNA double helix during transcription induces supercoiling in DNA as shown in. According to their model, transcribing RNA polymerase (RNAP) sliding along DNA forces the DNA to rotate on its helical axis. A hindrance in the free rotation of DNA might arise due to a topological constraint, causing the DNA in front of RNAP to become over-twisted (positively supercoiled) and the DNA behind RNAP would become under-twisted (negatively supercoiled). It has been found that a topological constraint is not needed because RNAP generates sufficient torque that causes supercoiling even in a linear DNA template. If DNA is already negatively supercoiled, this action relaxes existing negative supercoils before causing a buildup of positive supercoils ahead of RNAP and introduces more negative supercoils behind RNAP. In principle, DNA gyrase and Topo I should remove excess positive and negative supercoils respectively but if the RNAP elongation rate exceeds the turnover of the two enzymes, transcription contributes to the steady-state level of supercoiling.

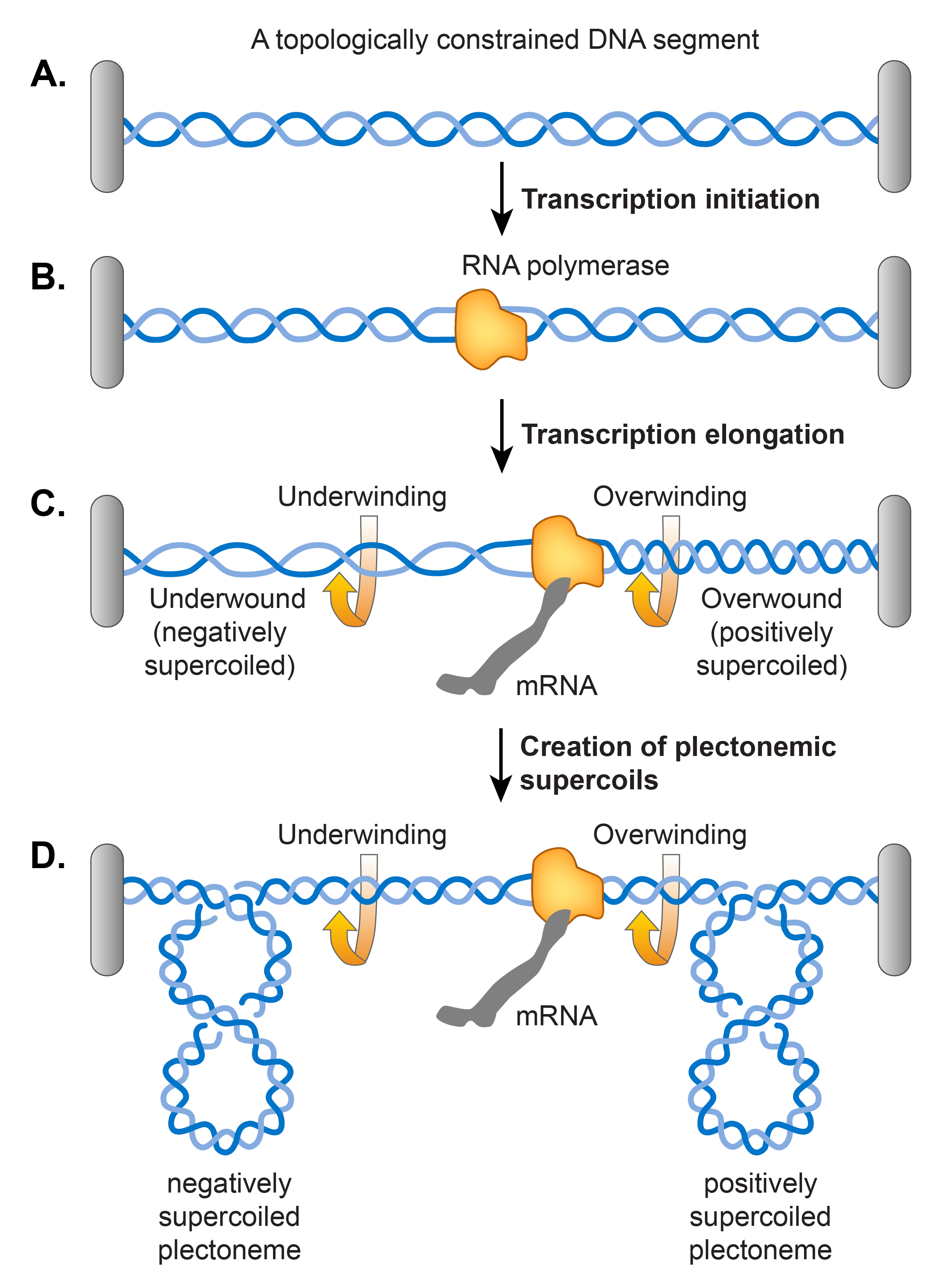
Twin supercoiling domain model for transcription-induced supercoiling A. An example of topologically constrained DNA. A grey bar represents a topological constraint, e.g. a protein or a membrane anchor. B. Accommodation of RNA polymerase for transcription initiation results in the opening of the DNA double helix. C. An elongating RNA polymerase complex cannot rotate around the helical axis of DNA. Therefore, removal of helical turns by RNA polymerase causes overwinding of the topologically constrained DNA ahead and underwinding of the DNA behind, generating positively and negatively supercoiled DNA, respectively. Supercoiling can manifest as either change in the numbers of twists as shown in C or plectonemic writhe as shown in D.

===== Control of supercoiling by NAPs =====
In the eukaryotic chromatin, DNA is rarely present in the free supercoiled form because nucleosomes restrain almost all negative supercoiling through tight binding of DNA to histones. Similarly, in E. coli, nucleoprotein complexes formed by NAPs restrain half of the supercoiling density of the nucleoid. In other words, if a NAP dissociates from a nucleoprotein complex, the DNA would adopt the free, plectonemic form. DNA binding of HU, Fis, and H-NS has been experimentally shown to restrain negative supercoiling in a relaxed but topologically constrained DNA. They can do so either by changing the helical pitch of DNA or generating toroidal writhes by DNA bending and wrapping. Alternatively, NAPs can preferentially bind to and stabilize other forms of the underwound DNA such as cruciform structures and branched plectonemes. Fis has been reported to organize branched plectonemes through its binding to cross-over regions and HU preferentially binds to cruciform structures.

NAPs also regulate DNA supercoiling indirectly. Fis can modulate supercoiling by repressing the transcription of the genes encoding DNA gyrase. There is genetic evidence to suggest that HU controls supercoiling levels by stimulating DNA gyrase and reducing the activity of Topo I. In support of the genetic studies, HU was shown to stimulate DNA gyrase-catalyzed decatenation of DNA in vitro. It is unclear mechanistically how HU modulates the activities of the gyrase and Topo I. HU might physically interact with DNA gyrase and Topo I or DNA organization activities of HU such as DNA bending may facilitate or inhibit the action of DNA gyrase and Topo I respectively.

==== Plectonemic supercoils organize into multiple topological domains ====
One of the striking features of the nucleoid is that plectonemic supercoils are organized into multiple topological domains. In other words, a single cut in one domain will only relax that domain and not the others. A topological domain forms because of a supercoiling-diffusion barrier. Independent studies employing different methods have reported that the topological domains are variable in size ranging from 10 to 400 kb. A random placement of barriers commonly observed in these studies seems to explain the wide variability in the size of domains.

Although identities of domain barriers remain to be established, possible mechanisms responsible for the formation of the barriers include: (i) A domain barrier could form when a protein with an ability to restrain supercoils simultaneously binds to two distinct sites on the chromosome forming a topologically isolated DNA loop or domain. It has been experimentally demonstrated that protein-mediated looping in supercoiled DNA can create a topological domain. NAPs such as H-NS and Fis are potential candidates, based on their DNA looping abilities and the distribution of their binding sites. (ii) Bacterial interspersed mosaic elements (BIMEs) also appear as potential candidates for domain barriers. BIMEs are palindromic repeats sequences that are usually found between genes. A BIME has been shown to impede diffusion of supercoiling in a synthetically designed topological cassette inserted in the E. coli chromosome. There are ~600 BIMEs distributed across the genome, possibly dividing the chromosome into 600 topological domains. (iii) Barriers could also result from the attachment of DNA to the cell membrane through a protein which binds to both DNA and membrane or through nascent transcription and the translation of membrane-anchored proteins. (iv) Transcription activity can generate supercoiling-diffusion barriers. An actively transcribing RNAP has been shown to block dissipation of plectonemic supercoils, thereby forming a supercoiling-diffusion barrier.

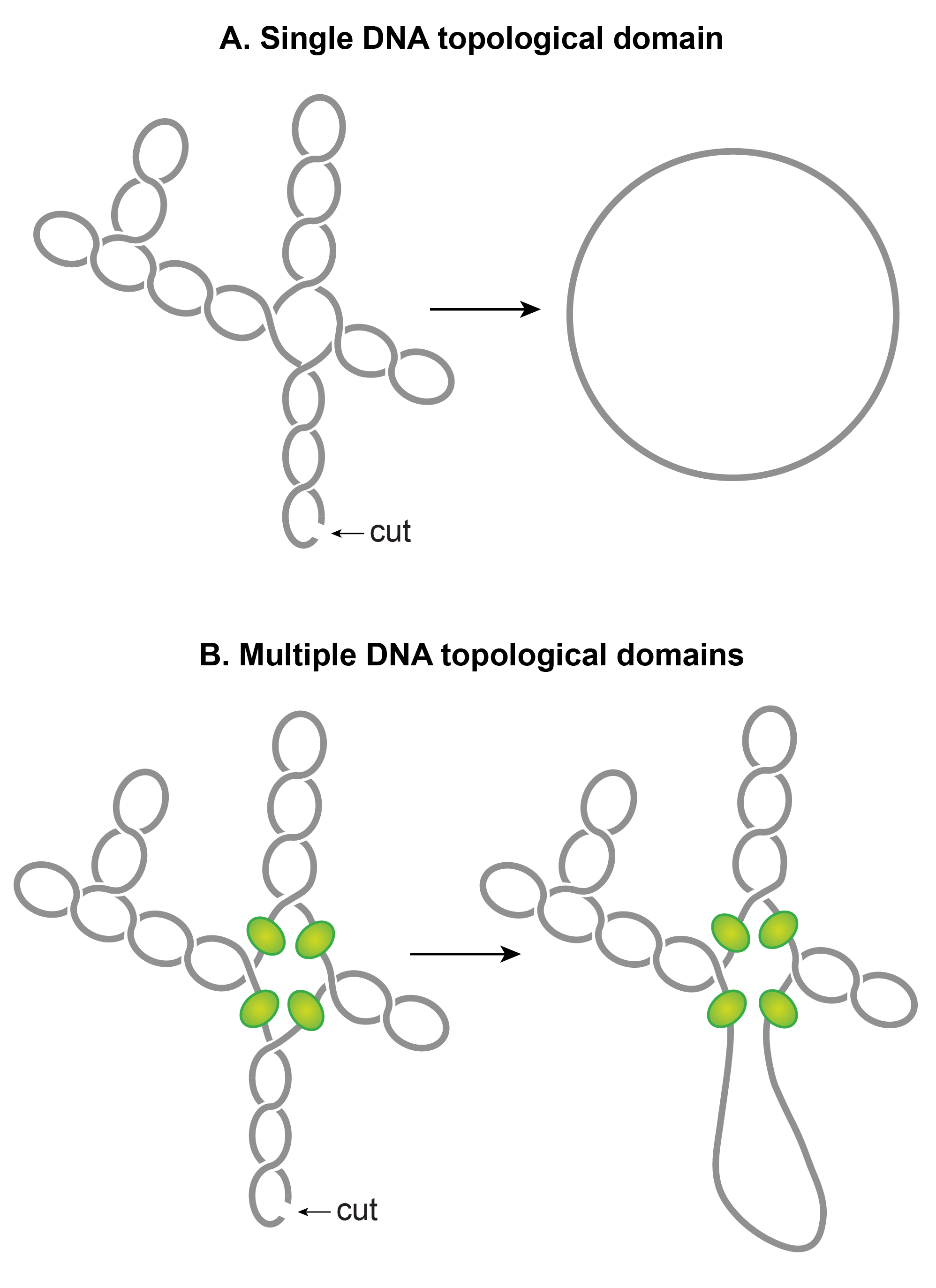
The chromosomal DNA within the nucleoid is segregated into independent supercoiled topological domains A. An illustration of a single topological domain of a supercoiled DNA. A single double-stranded cut anywhere would be sufficient to relax the supercoiling tension of the entire domain. B. An illustration of multiple topological domains in a supercoiled DNA molecule. A presence of supercoiling-diffusion barriers segregates a supercoiled DNA molecule into multiple topological domains. Hypothetical supercoiling diffusion barriers are represented as green spheres. As a result, a single double-stranded cut will only relax one topological domain and not the others. Plectonemic supercoils of DNA within the E. coli nucleoid are organized into several topological domains, but only four domains with a different number of supercoils are shown for simplicity.

== Growth-phase dependent nucleoid dynamics ==
The nucleoid reorganizes in stationary phase cells suggesting that the nucleoid structure is highly dynamic, determined by the physiological state of cells. A comparison of high-resolution contact maps of the nucleoid revealed that the long-range contacts in the Ter macrodomain increased in the stationary phase, compared to the growth phase. Furthermore, CID boundaries in the stationary phase were different from those found in the growth phase. Finally, nucleoid morphology undergoes massive transformation during prolonged stationary phase; the nucleoid exhibits ordered, toroidal structures.

Growth-phase specific changes in nucleoid structure could be brought about by a change in levels of nucleoid-associated DNA architectural proteins (the NAPs and the Muk subunits), supercoiling, and transcription activity. The abundance of NAPs and the Muk subunits changes according to the bacterial growth cycle. Fis and the starvation-induced DNA binding protein Dps, another NAP, are almost exclusively present in the growth phase and stationary phase respectively. Fis levels rise upon entry into exponential phase and then rapidly decline while cells are still in the exponential phase, reaching levels that are undetectable in stationary phase. While Fis levels start to decline, levels of Dps start to rise and reach a maximum in the stationary phase. A dramatic transition in the nucleoid structure observed in the prolonged stationary phase has been mainly attributed to Dps. It forms DNA/crystalline assemblies that act to protect the nucleoid from DNA damaging agents present during starvation.

HU, IHF, and H-NS are present in both growth phase and stationary phase. However, their abundance changes significantly such that HU and Fis are the most abundant NAPs in the growth phase, whereas IHF and Dps become the most abundant NAPs in the stationary phase. HUαα is the predominant form in early exponential phase, whereas the heterodimeric form predominates in the stationary phase, with minor amounts of homodimers. This transition has functional consequences regarding nucleoid structure, because the two forms appear to organize and condense DNA differently; both homo- and heterodimers form filaments, but only the homodimer can bring multiple DNA segments together to form a DNA network. The copy number of MukB increases two-fold in stationary phase. An increase in the number of MukB molecules could have influence on the processivity of the MukBEF complex as a DNA loop extruding factor resulting in larger or a greater number of the loops.

Supercoiling can act in a concerted manner with DNA architectural proteins to reorganize the nucleoid. The overall supercoiling level decreases in the stationary phase, and supercoiling exhibits a different pattern at the regional level. Changes in supercoiling can alter the topological organization of the nucleoid. Furthermore, because a chromosomal region of high transcription activity forms a CID boundary, changes in transcription activity during different growth phases could alter the formation of CID boundaries, and thus the spatial organization of the nucleoid. It is possible that changes in CID boundaries observed in the stationary phase could be due to the high expression of a different set of genes in the stationary phase compared to the growth phase.

== Nucleoid structure and gene expression ==
=== NAPs and gene expression ===
The E. coli chromosome structure and gene expression appear to influence each other reciprocally. On the one hand, a correlation of a CID boundary with high transcription activity indicates that chromosome organization is driven by transcription. On the other hand, the 3D structure of DNA within nucleoid at every scale may be linked to gene expression. First, it has been shown that reorganization of the 3D architecture of the nucleoid in E. coli can dynamically modulate cellular transcription pattern. A mutant of HUa made the nucleoid very much condensed by increased positive superhelicity of the chromosomal DNA. Consequently, many genes were repressed, and many quiescent genes were expressed. Besides, there are many specific cases in which protein-mediated local architectural changes alter gene transcription. For example, the formation of rigid nucleoprotein filaments by H-NS blocks RNAP access to the promoter thus prevent gene transcription. Through gene silencing, H-NS acts as a global repressor preferentially inhibiting transcription of horizontally transferred genes. In another example, specific binding of HU at the gal operon facilitates the formation of a DNA loop that keeps the gal operon repressed in the absence of the inducer. The topologically distinct DNA micro-loop created by coherent bending of DNA by Fis at stable RNA promoters activates transcription. DNA bending by IHF differentially controls transcription from the two tandem promoters of the ilvGMEDA operon in E. coli. Specific topological changes by NAPs not only regulate gene transcription, but are also involved in other processes such as DNA replication initiation, recombination, and transposition. In contrast to specific gene regulation, how higher-order chromosome structure and its dynamics influences gene expression globally at the molecular level remains to be worked out.

=== DNA supercoiling and gene expression ===
A two-way interconnectedness exists between DNA supercoiling and gene transcription. Negative supercoiling of the promoter region can stimulate transcription by facilitating the promoter melting and by increasing the DNA binding affinity of a protein regulator. Stochastic bursts of transcription appear to be a general characteristic of highly expressed genes, and supercoiling levels of the DNA template contributes to transcriptional bursting. According to the twin supercoiling domain model, transcription of a gene can influence transcription of other nearby genes through a supercoiling relay. One such example is the activation of the leu-500 promoter. Supercoiling not only mediates gene-specific changes, but it also mediates large-scale changes in gene expression. Topological organization of the nucleoid could allow independent expression of supercoiling-sensitive genes in different topological domains. A genome-scale map of unrestrained supercoiling showed that genomic regions have different steady-state supercoiling densities, indicating that the level of supercoiling differs in individual topological domains. As a result, a change in supercoiling can result in domain-specific gene expression, depending on the level of supercoiling in each domain.

The effect of supercoiling on gene expression can be mediated by NAPs that directly or indirectly influence supercoiling. The effect of HU on gene expression appears to involve a change in supercoiling and perhaps a higher-order DNA organization. A positive correlation between DNA gyrase binding and upregulation of the genes caused by the absence of HU suggests that changes in supercoiling are responsible for differential expression. HU was also found to be responsible for a positional effect on gene expression by insulating transcriptional units by constraining transcription-induced supercoiling. Point mutations in HUa dramatically changed the gene expression profile of E. coli, altering its morphology, physiology, and metabolism. As a result, the mutant strain was more invasive of mammalian cells. This dramatic effect was concomitant with nucleoid compaction and increased positive supercoiling. The mutant protein was an octamer, in contrast to the wild-type dimer. It wraps DNA on its surface in a right-handed manner, restraining positive supercoils as opposed to wild-type HU. These studies show that amino acid substitutions in HU can have a dramatic effect on nucleoid structure, that in turn results in significant phenotypic changes.

Since MukB and HU have emerged as critical players in long-range DNA interactions, it will be worthwhile to compare the effect of each of these two proteins on global gene expression. Although HU appears to control gene expression by modulating supercoiling density, the exact molecular mechanism remains unknown and the impact of MukB on gene expression is yet to be analyzed.

== Spatial organization ==
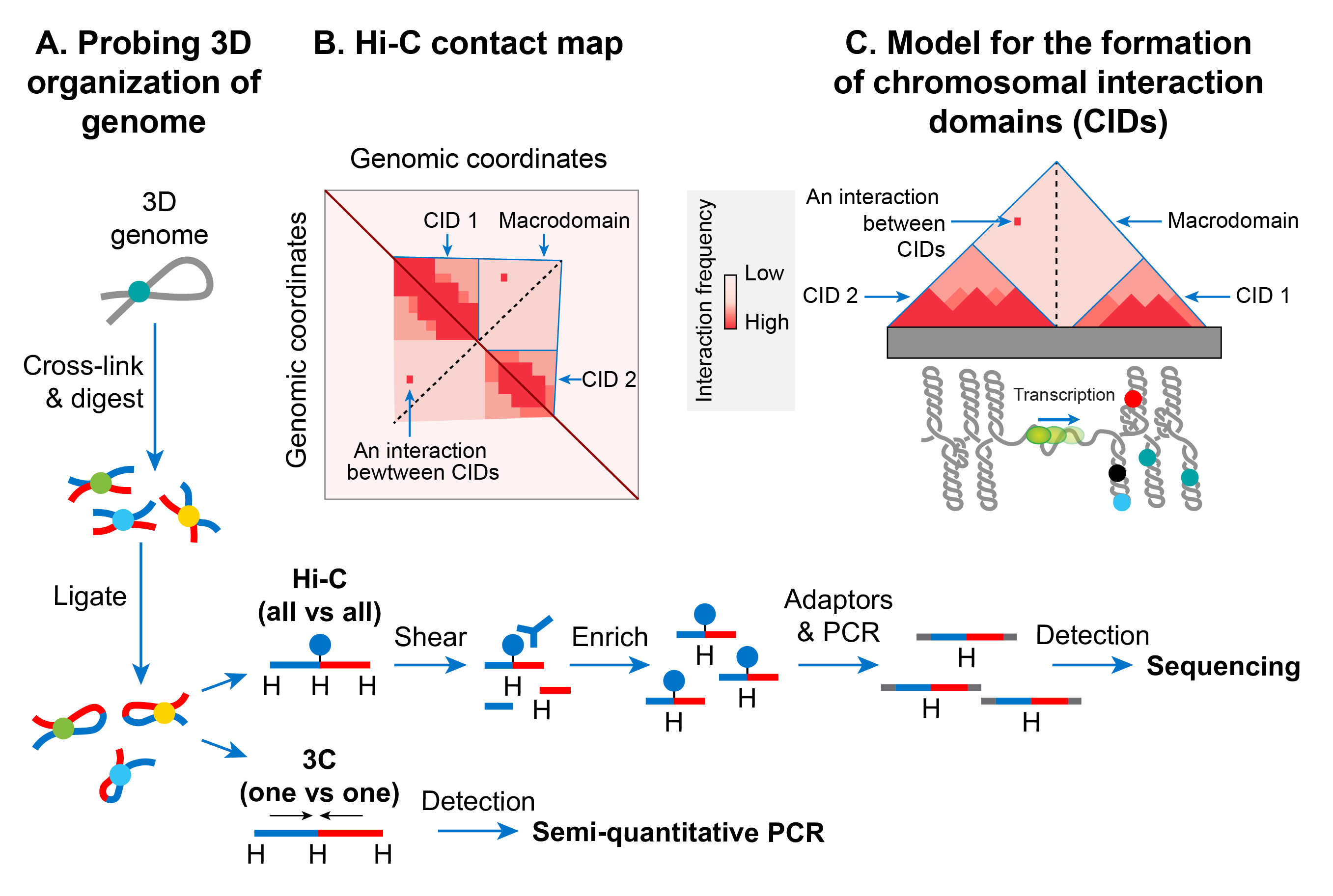
The bacterial nucleoid is organized into chromosomal interaction domains (CIDs) and macrodomains. (A) Methods for mapping the 3D genome. Chromosome conformation capture (3C) techniques map 3D genome structure by measuring how often different DNA regions physically touch, even if they are far apart on the linear strand. First, DNA is chemically glued (cross-linked) with formaldehyde to lock touching regions in place, then cut into pieces using molecular scissors (restriction enzymes). Next, the pieces are glued back together (ligated) in a highly diluted mixture to ensure fragments only join with what they were already touching. The frequency of these newly joined junctions reveals how closely the regions interact. In the basic 3C method, these junctions are measured using targeted tests (PCR) to evaluate interactions between two specific pre-selected DNA regions. The more advanced Hi-C version maps all physical connections across the entire genome simultaneously. In Hi-C, the cut DNA ends are marked with a chemical tag (biotin) before they are glued. The DNA is then broken into tiny fragments, the tagged junctions are pulled down and purified, and the connections are counted using high-speed next-generation sequencing. (B) Representing 3D interactions as a heatmap. Hi-C data is plotted on a 2D grid (matrix) where both axes represent coordinates along the DNA strand. The genome is divided into fixed-size square units (such as 5-kb bins), which determine the map’s resolution. Each entry in the grid ($m_{ij}$) represents the number of sequenced junction reads mapped between bins $i$ and $j$. When these counts are colored as a heatmap, they show how often those regions touch. The bright diagonal line represents the frequent contact between DNA regions that sit right next to each other on the linear strand. Colors further from the diagonal show how often distant regions fold over to touch. Bright, high-intensity triangles along the diagonal represent CIDs—self-contained DNA neighborhoods that interact heavily with themselves but are separated from adjacent neighborhoods by quiet boundary zones with very few interactions. (C) Physical mechanisms organizing DNA domains. In bacteria like 'E. coli', tight, cord-like twisting of the DNA (plectonemic supercoiling) creates these CIDs, prompting high self-interaction within each domain. Active molecular machines (RNA polymerases, green spheres) read genes and unwind this tight coiling, creating a coil-free boundary (plectoneme-free region, or PFR) that stops the twisting from spreading between neighboring domains. Helper anchoring proteins (nucleoid-associated proteins, closed circles) help stabilize these twisted loops. Individual CIDs range in size from 30 to 400 kb. Multiple adjacent CIDs merge into larger triangular structures called macrodomains, meaning the DNA loops within a macrodomain touch each other far more frequently than they touch neighboring macrodomains or external DNA regions. For simplicity, a macrodomain consisting of only two CIDs is illustrated.

=== Chromosomal interaction domains ===
In recent years, the advent of a molecular method called chromosome conformation capture (3C) has allowed studying a high-resolution spatial organization of chromosomes in both bacteria and eukaryotes. 3C and its version that is coupled with deep sequencing (Hi-C) determine physical proximity, if any, between any two genomic loci in 3D space. A high-resolution contact map of bacterial chromosomes including the E. coli chromosome has revealed that a bacterial chromosome is segmented into many highly self-interacting regions called chromosomal interaction domains (CIDs). CIDs are equivalent to topologically associating domains (TADs) observed in many eukaryotic chromosomes, suggesting that the formation of CIDs is a general phenomenon of genome organization. Two characteristics define CIDs or TADs. First, genomic regions of a CID physically interact with each other more frequently than with the genomic regions outside that CID or with those of a neighboring CID. Second, the presence of a boundary between CIDs that prevents physical interactions between genomic regions of two neighboring CIDs.

The E. coli chromosome was found to consist of 31 CIDs in the growth phase. The size of the CIDs ranged from 40 to ~300 kb. It appears that a supercoiling-diffusion barrier responsible for segregating plectonemic DNA loops into topological domains functions as a CID boundary in E. coli and many other bacteria. In other words, the presence of a supercoiling-diffusion barrier defines the formation of CIDs. Findings from the Hi-C probing of chromosomes in E. coli, Caulobacter crescentus, and Bacillus subtilis converge on a model that CIDs form because plectonemic looping together with DNA organization activities of NAPs promotes physical interactions among genomic loci, and a CID boundary consists of a plectoneme-free region (PFR) that prevents these interactions. A PFR is created due to high transcription activity because the helical unwinding of DNA by actively transcribing RNAP restrains plectonemic supercoils. As a result, dissipation of supercoils is also blocked, creating a supercoiling-diffusion barrier. Indirect evidence for this model comes from an observation that CIDs of bacterial chromosomes including the E. coli chromosome display highly transcribed genes at their boundaries, indicating a role of transcription in the formation of a CID boundary. More direct evidence came from a finding that the placement of a highly transcribed gene at a position where no boundary was present created a new CID boundary in the C. crescentus chromosome. However, not all CID boundaries correlated with highly transcribed genes in the E. coli chromosome suggesting that other unknown factors are also responsible for the formation of CID boundaries and supercoiling diffusion barriers.

=== Macrodomains ===
Plectonemic DNA loops organized as topological domains or CIDs appear to coalesce further to form large spatially distinct domains called macrodomains (MDs). In E. coli, MDs were initially identified as large segments of the genome whose DNA markers localized together (co-localized) in fluorescence in situ hybridization (FISH) studies. A large genomic region (~1-Mb) covering oriC (origin of chromosome replication) locus co-localized and was called Ori macrodomain. Likewise, a large genomic region (~1-Mb) covering the replication terminus region (ter) co-localized and was called Ter macrodomain. MDs were later identified based on how frequently pairs of lambda att sites that were inserted at various distant locations in the chromosome recombined with each other. In this recombination-based method, an MD was defined as a large genomic region whose DNA sites can primarily recombine with each other, but not with those outside of that MD. The recombination-based method confirmed the Ori and Ter MDs that were identified in FISH studies and identified two additional MDs.

The two additional MDs were formed by the additional ~1-Mb regions flanking the Ter and were referred to as Left and Right. These four MDs (Ori, Ter, Left, and Right) composed most of the genome, except for two genomic regions flanking the Ori. These two regions (NS-L and NS-R) were more flexible and non-structured compared to an MD as DNA sites in them recombined with DNA sites located in MDs on both sides. The genetic position of oriC appears to dictate the formation of MDs, because repositioning of oriC by genetic manipulation results in the reorganization of MDs. For example, genomic regions closest to the oriC always behave as an NS regardless of DNA sequence and regions further away always behave as MDs.

The Hi-C technique further confirmed a hierarchical spatial organization of CIDs in the form of macrodomains. In other words, CIDs of a macrodomain physically interacted with each other more frequently than with CIDs of a neighboring macrodomain or with genomic loci outside of that macrodomain. The Hi-C data showed that the E. coli chromosome was partitioning into two distinct domains. The region surrounding ter formed an insulated domain that overlapped with the previously identified Ter MD. DNA-DNA contacts in this domain occurred only in the range of up to ~280 kb. The rest of the chromosome formed a single domain whose genomic loci exhibited contacts in the range of >280-kb. While most of the contacts in this domain were restricted to a maximum distance of ~500 kb, there were two loose regions whose genomic loci formed contacts at even greater distances (up to ~1 Mb). These loose regions corresponded to the previously identified flexible and less-structured regions (NS). The boundaries of the insulated domain encompassing ter and the two loose regions identified by the Hi-C method segmented the entire chromosome into six regions that correspond with the four MDs and two NS regions defined by recombination-based assays.

==== Proteins that drive macrodomain formation ====
===== MatP =====
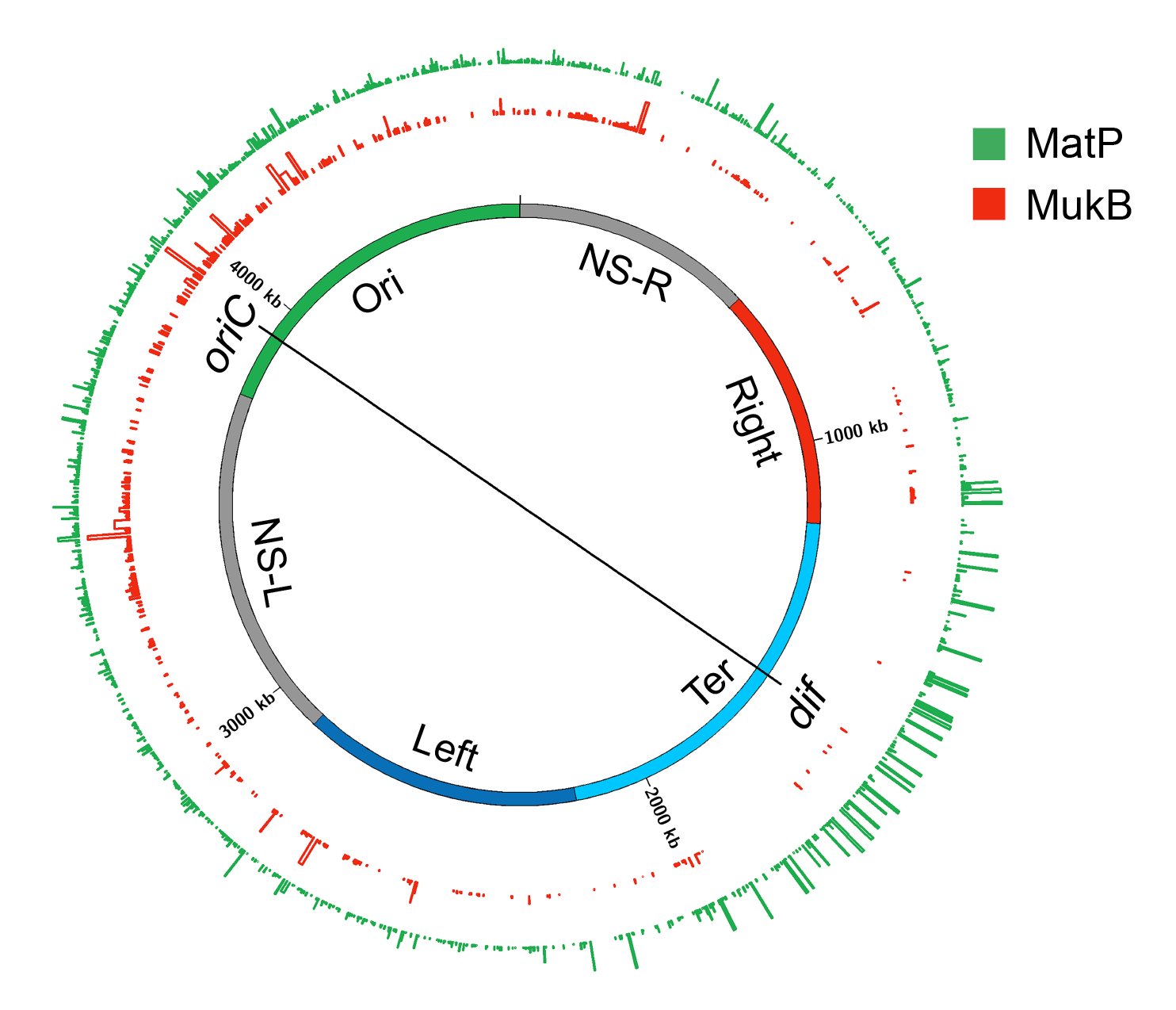
Genome-wide occupancy of MatP and MukB of E. coli A circular layout of the E. coli genome depicting genome-wide occupancy of MatP and MukB in E. coli. The innermost circle depicts the E. coli genome. The regions of the genome which organize as spatial domains(macrodomains) in the nucleoid are indicated as colored bands. Histogram plots of genome occupancy for MatP and MukB as determined by chromatin-immunoprecipitation coupled with DNA sequencing (ChIP-seq) are shown in outside circles. The bin size of the histograms is 300 bp. The figure was prepared in circos/0.69-6 using the processed ChIP-Seq data from.

A search for protein(s) responsible for macrodomain formation led to identification of Macrodomain Ter protein (MatP). MatP almost exclusively binds in the Ter MD by recognizing a 13-bp motif called the macrodomain ter sequence (matS). There are 23 matS sites present in the Ter domain, on average there is one site every 35-kb. Further evidence of MatP binding in the Ter domain comes from fluorescence imaging of MatP. Discrete MatP foci were observed that co-localized with Ter domain DNA markers. A strong enrichment of ChIP-Seq signal in the Ter MD also corroborates the preferential binding of MatP to this domain.

MatP condenses DNA in the Ter domain because the lack of MatP increased the distance between two fluorescent DNA markers located 100-kb apart in the Ter domain. Furthermore, MatP is a critical player in insulating the Ter domain from the rest of the chromosome. It promotes DNA-DNA contacts within the Ter domain but prevents contacts between the DNA loci of Ter domain and those of flanking regions. How does MatP condense DNA and promote DNA-DNA contacts? The experimental results are conflicting. MatP can form a DNA loop between two matS sites in vitro and its DNA looping activity depends on MatP tetramerization. Tetramerization occurs via coiled-coil interactions between two MatP molecules bound to DNA. One obvious model based on in vitro results is that MatP promotes DNA-DNA contacts in vivo by bridging matS sites. However, although MatP connected distant sites in Hi-C studies, it did not specifically connect the matS sites. Furthermore, a MatP mutant that was unable to form tetramers behaved like wild-type. These results argue against the matS bridging model for Ter organization, leaving the mechanism of MatP action elusive. One possibility is that MatP spreads to nearby DNA segments from its primary matS binding site and bridge distant sites via a mechanism that does not depend on the tetramerization.

===== MukBEF =====
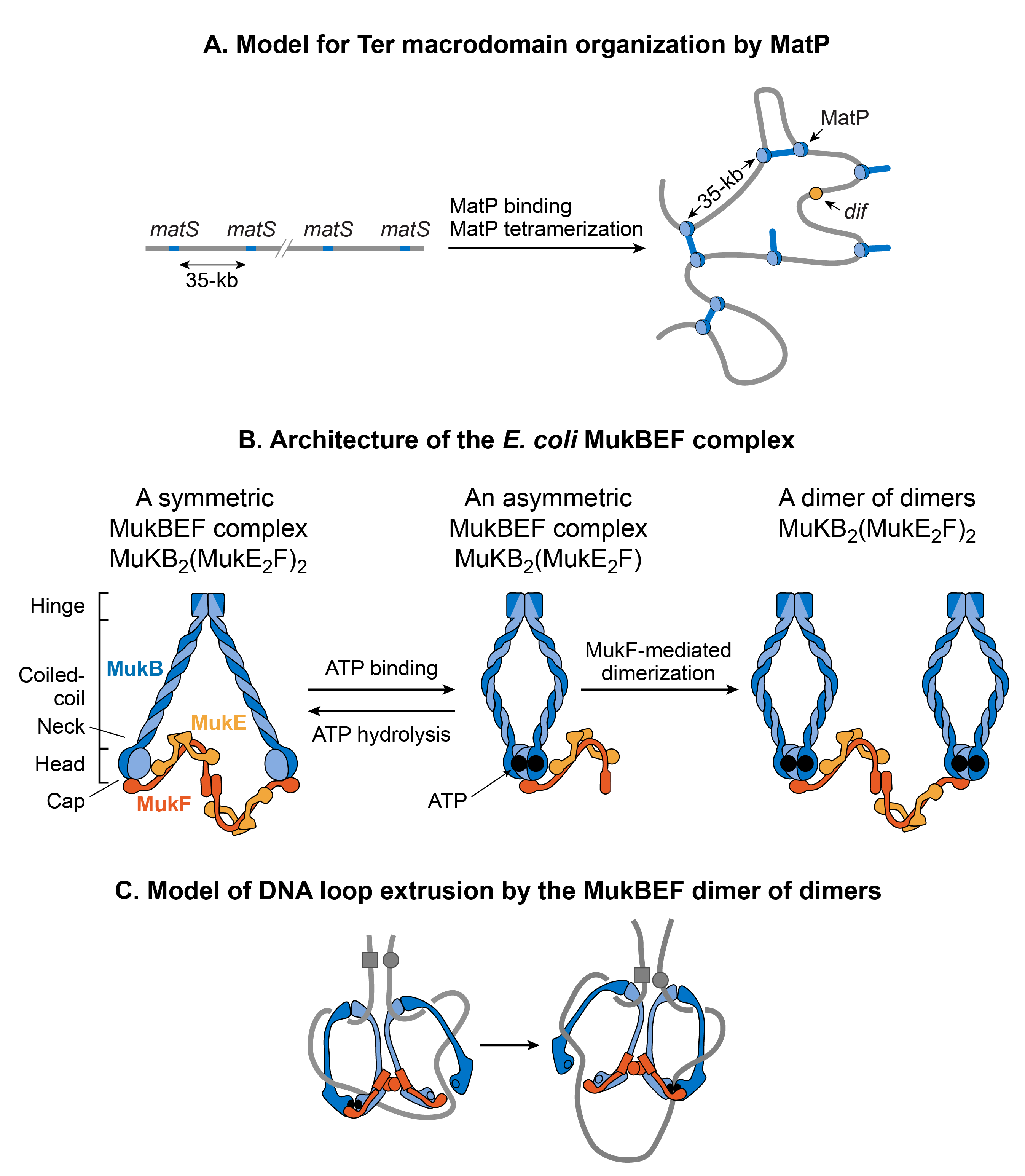
Models for DNA organization by MatP and MukBEF A. A matS-bridging model for DNA organization in the Ter macrodomain by MatP. MatP recognizes a 13-bp signature DNA sequence called matS that is present exclusively in the Ter macrodomain. There are 23 matS sites separated by one another by an average of 35-kb. MatP binds to a matS site as a dimer, and the tetramerization of the DNA-bound dimers bridges matS sites forming large DNA loops. B. The architecture of the E. coli MukBEF complex. The complex is formed by protein-protein interactions between MukB (blue), MukF (dark orange) and MukE (light orange). MukB, which belongs to the family of structural maintenance of chromosomes (SMCs) proteins, forms a dimer (monomers are shown by dark and light blue colors) consisting of an ATPase head domain and a 100 nm long intramolecular coiled-coil with a hinge region in the middle. Because of the flexibility of the hinge region, MukB adopts a characteristic V-shape of the SMC family. MukF also tends to exist as a dimer because of the strong dimerization affinity between monomers. The C-terminal domain of MukF can interact with the head domain of MukB while its central domain can interact with MukE. Two molecules of MukE and one molecule of MukF associate with each other independent of MukB to form a trimeric complex (MukE_{2}F). Since MukF tends to exist in a dimeric form, the dimerization of MukF results in an elongated hexameric complex (MukE_{2}F)_{2}. In the absence of ATP, the (MukE_{2}F)_{2} complex binds to the MukB head domains through the C-terminal domain of MukF to form a symmetric MukBEF complex (shown on the left). The stoichiometry of the symmetric complex is B_{2}(E_{2}F)_{2}. The ATP binding between the MukB head domains forces the detachment of one MukF molecule and two MukE molecules. As a result, an asymmetric MukBEF complex of the stoichiometry B_{2}(E_{2}F)_{1} is formed. Since MukF readily dimerizes, the MukF dimerization can potentially join two ATP-bound asymmetric molecules resulting in the formation of a dimer of dimers with the stoichiometry of B_{4}(E_{2}F)_{2} (shown on the right). The stoichiometry of the MukBEF complex in vivo is estimated to be B_{4}(E_{2}F)_{2} suggesting that a dimer of dimers is the functional unit in vivo. C. A model for loop extrusion by a MukBEF dimer of dimers. A dimer of dimer loads onto DNA (depicted as a grey line) through DNA binding domains of MukB. MukB has been shown to bind DNA via its hinge region and the top region of its head domain. The translocation of the complex away from its loading site then extrudes DNA loops. The loops are extruded in a rock-climbing manner by the coordinated opening and closing of the MukBEF ring through the MukB head disengagement that occurs due to coordinated ATP hydrolysis in the two dimers. Dark and light blue circles represent ATP binding and hydrolysis events respectively. MukE is not shown in the complex for simplicity.

MukB belongs to a family of ATPases called structural maintenance of chromosome proteins (SMCs), which participate in higher-order chromosome organization in eukaryotes. Two MukB monomers associate via continuous antiparallel coiled-coil interaction forming a 100-nm long rigid rod. A flexible hinge region occurs in the middle of the rod. Due to the flexibility of the hinge region, MukB adopts a characteristic V-shape of the SMC family. The non-SMC subunits associating with MukB are MukE and MukF. The association closes the V formation, resulting in large ring-like structures. MukE and MukF are encoded together with MukB in the same operon in E. coli. Deletion of either subunit results in the same phenotype suggesting that the MukBEF complex is the functional unit in vivo. DNA binding activities of the complex reside in the MukB subunit, whereas MukE and MukF modulate MukB activity.

MukBEF complex, together with Topo IV, is required for decatenation and repositioning of newly replicated oriCs. The role of MukBEF is not restricted during DNA replication. It organizes and condenses DNA even in non-replicating cells. The recent high-resolution chromosome conformation map of the MukB-depleted E. coli strain reveals that MukB participates in the formation of DNA-DNA interactions on the entire chromosome, except in the Ter domain. How is MukB prevented from acting in the Ter domain? MatP physically interacts with MukB, thus preventing MukB from localizing to the Ter domain. This is evident in the DNA binding of MatP and MukB in the Ter domain. DNA binding of MatP is enriched in the Ter domain, whereas DNA binding of MukB is reduced compared to the rest of the genome. Furthermore, in a strain already lacking MatP, the absence of MukB causes a reduction in DNA contacts throughout the chromosome, including the Ter domain. This result agrees with the view that MatP displaces MukB from the Ter domain.

How does the MukBEF complex function to organize the E. coli chromosome? According to the current view, SMC complexes organize chromosomes by extruding DNA loops. SMC complexes translocate along DNA to extrude loops in a cis-manner (on the same DNA molecule), wherein the size of loops depends on processivity of the complex. SMC complexes from different organisms differ in the mechanism of loop extrusion. Single molecule fluorescence microscopy of MukBEF in E. coli suggests that the minimum functional unit in vivo is a dimer of dimers. This unit is formed by joining of two ATP-bound MukBEF complexes through MukF-mediated dimerization. MukBEF localizes in the cell as 1-3 clusters that are elongated parallel to the long axis of the cell. Each cluster contains an average ~ 8-10 dimers of dimers. According to the current model, the MukBEF extrudes DNA loops in a "rock-climbing" manner. A dimer of the dimers releases one segment of DNA and capture a new DNA segment without dissociating from the chromosome. Besides DNA looping, a link between negative supercoiling and in vivo MukBEF function together with the ability of the MukB subunit to constrain negative supercoils in vitro suggests that MukBEF organizes DNA by generating supercoils.

=== Role of NAPs and naRNAs ===
In addition to contributing to the chromosome compaction by bending, bridging, and looping DNA at a smaller scale (~1-kb), NAPs participate in DNA condensation and organization by promoting long-rang DNA-DNA contacts. Two NAPs, Fis and HU, emerged as the key players in promoting long-range DNA-DNA contacts that occur throughout the chromosome. It remains to be studied how DNA organization activities of Fis and HU that are well understood at a smaller scale (~1-kb) results in the formation of long-range DNA-DNA interactions. Nonetheless, some of the HU-mediated DNA interactions require the presence of naRNA4. naRNA4 also participates in making long-range DNA contacts. HU catalyzes some of the contacts, not all, suggesting that RNA participates with other NAPs in forming DNA contacts. HU also appears to act together with MukB to promote long-range DNA-DNA interactions. This view is based on observations that the absence of either HU or MukB caused a reduction in the same DNA-DNA contacts. It is unclear how MukB and HU potentially act together in promoting DNA-DNA interactions. It is possible that the two proteins interact physically. Alternatively, while MukBEF extrudes large DNA loops, HU condenses and organizes those loops.

=== Role of functional relatedness of genes ===
There are reports that functionally-related genes of E. coli are physically together in 3D space within the chromosome even though they are far apart by genetic distance. Spatial proximity of functionally-related genes not only make the biological functions more compartmentalized and efficient but would also contribute to the folding and spatial organization of the nucleoid. A recent study using fluorescent markers for detection of specific DNA loci examined pairwise physical distances between the seven rRNA operons that are genetically separated from each other (by as much as two million bp). It reported that all of the operons, except rrnC, were in physical proximity. Surprisingly, 3C-seq studies did not reveal the physical clustering of rrn operons, contradicting the results of the fluorescence-based study. Therefore, further investigation is required to resolve these contradicting observations. In another example, GalR, forms an interaction network of GalR binding sites that are scattered across the chromosome. GalR is a transcriptional regulator of the galactose regulon composed of genes encoding enzymes for transport and metabolism of the sugar D-galactose. GalR exists in only one to two foci in cells and can self-assemble into large ordered structures. Therefore, it appears that DNA-bound GalR multimerizes to form long-distance interactions.

== Global shape and structure ==
Conventional transmission electron microscopy (TEM) of chemically fixed E. coli cells portrayed the nucleoid as an irregularly shaped organelle. However, wide-field fluorescence imaging of live nucleoids in 3D revealed a discrete, ellipsoid shape. The overlay of a phase-contrast image of the cell and the fluorescent image of the nucleoid showed a close juxtaposition only in the radial dimension along its entire length of the nucleoid to the cell periphery. This finding indicates radial confinement of the nucleoid. A detailed examination of the 3D fluorescence image after cross-sectioning perpendicular to its long axis further revealed two global features of the nucleoid: curvature and longitudinal, high-density regions. Examining the chirality of the centerline of the nucleoid by connecting the center of intensity of each cross-section showed that the overall nucleoid shape is curved. The fluorescence intensity distribution in the cross-sections revealed a density substructure, consisting of curved, high-density regions or bundles at the central core, and low-density regions at the periphery. One implication of the radial confinement is that it determines the curved shape of the nucleoid. According to one model, the nucleoid is forced to bend because it is confined into a cylindrical E. coli cell whose radius is smaller than its bendable length (persistence length). This model was supported by observations that removal of the cell wall or inhibition of cell wall synthesis increased the radius of the cell and resulted in a concomitant increase in the helical radius and a decrease in the helical pitch in the nucleoid.

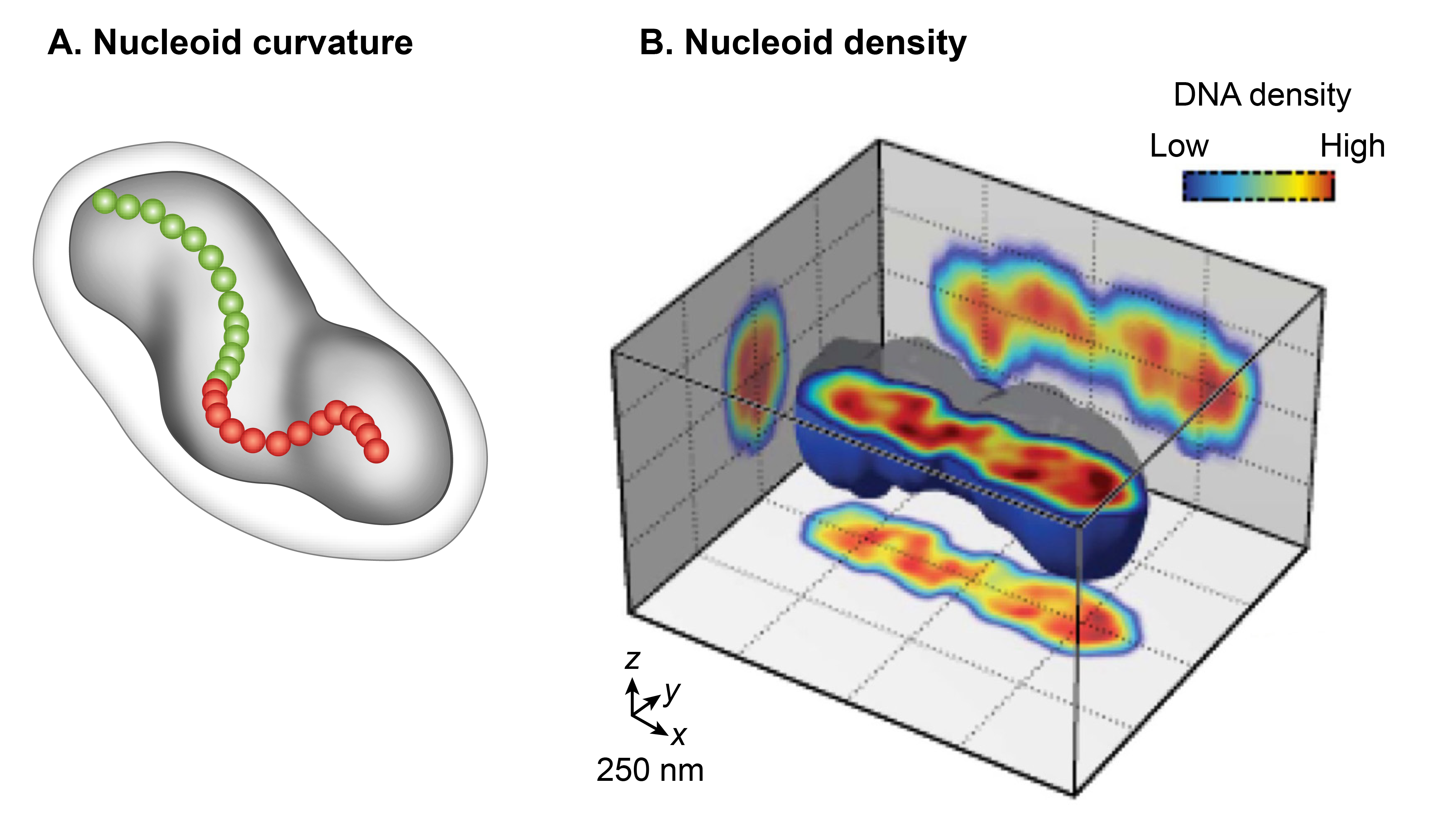
Nucleoid as a helical ellipsoid with longitudinal high-density DNA regions A. A cartoon of E. coli cell with a curved nucleoid (dark grey). A curved centroids path, denoted by red and green dots, emphasizes the curved shape of the nucleoid B. Cross-sectioning of the E. coli nucleoid visualized by HU-mCherry. Fluorescence intensity is taken as a proxy for DNA density and is represented by blue to red in increasing order.

=== Nucleoid-membrane connections ===
An expansion force due to DNA-membrane connections appears to function in opposition to condensation forces to maintain an optimal condensation level of the nucleoid. Cell-fractionation and electron microscopy studies first indicated the possibility of DNA-membrane connections. There are now several known examples of DNA-membrane connections. Transertion is a mechanism of concurrent transcription, translation, and insertion of nascent membrane proteins that forms transient DNA-membrane contacts. Transertion of two membrane proteins LacY and TetA has been demonstrated to cause the repositioning of chromosomal loci toward the membrane. Another mechanism of nucleoid-membrane connections is through a direct contact between membrane-anchored transcription regulators and their target sites in the chromosome. One example of such as transcription regulator in E. coli is CadC. CadC contains a periplasmic sensory domain and a cytoplasmic DNA binding domain. Sensing of an acidic environment by its periplasmic sensory domain stimulates DNA binding activity of CadC, which then activates transcription of its target genes. The membrane-localization of genes regulated by a membrane-anchored transcription regulator is yet to be demonstrated. Nonetheless, activation of target genes in the chromosome by these regulators is expected to result in a nucleoid-membrane contact albeit it would be a dynamic contact. Besides these examples, the chromosome is also specifically anchored to the cell membrane through protein-protein interaction between DNA-bound proteins, e.g., SlmA and MatP, and the divisome. Since membrane-protein encoding genes are distributed throughout the genome, dynamic DNA-membrane contacts through transertion can act as a nucleoid expansion force. This expansion force would function in opposition to condensation forces to maintain an optimal condensation level. The formation of highly condensed nucleoids upon the exposure of E. coli cells to chloramphenicol, which blocks translation, provides support for the expansion force of transient DNA-membrane contacts formed through transertion. The round shape of overly-condensed nucleoids after chloramphenicol treatment also suggests a role for transertion-mediated DNA-membrane contacts in defining the ellipsoid shape of the nucleoid.

== Visualization ==
The nucleoid can be clearly visualized on an electron micrograph at very high magnification, where, although its appearance may differ, it is clearly visible against the cytosol. Sometimes even strands of what is thought to be DNA are visible. By staining with the Feulgen stain, which specifically stains DNA, the nucleoid can also be seen under a light microscope. The DNA-intercalating stains DAPI and ethidium bromide are widely used for fluorescence microscopy of nucleoids. It has an irregular shape and is found in prokaryotic cells.

== DNA damage and repair ==
Changes in the structure of the nucleoid of bacteria and archaea are observed after exposure to DNA damaging conditions. The nucleoids of the bacteria Bacillus subtilis and Escherichia coli both become significantly more compact after UV irradiation. Formation of the compact structure in E. coli requires RecA activation through specific RecA-DNA interactions. The RecA protein plays a key role in homologous recombinational repair of DNA damage.

Similar to B. subtilis and E. coli above, exposures of the Archaean Haloferax Volcanii to stresses that damage DNA cause compaction and reorganization of the nucleoid. Compaction depends on the Mre11-Rad50 protein complex that catalyzes an early step in homologous recombinational repair of double-strand breaks in DNA. It has been proposed that nucleoid compaction is part of a DNA damage response that accelerates cell recovery by helping DNA repair proteins to locate targets, and by facilitating the search for intact DNA sequences during homologous recombination.

== See also ==
- Plasmid
- Homologous recombination
- DNA repair
