= ISG15 =

Protein found in humans

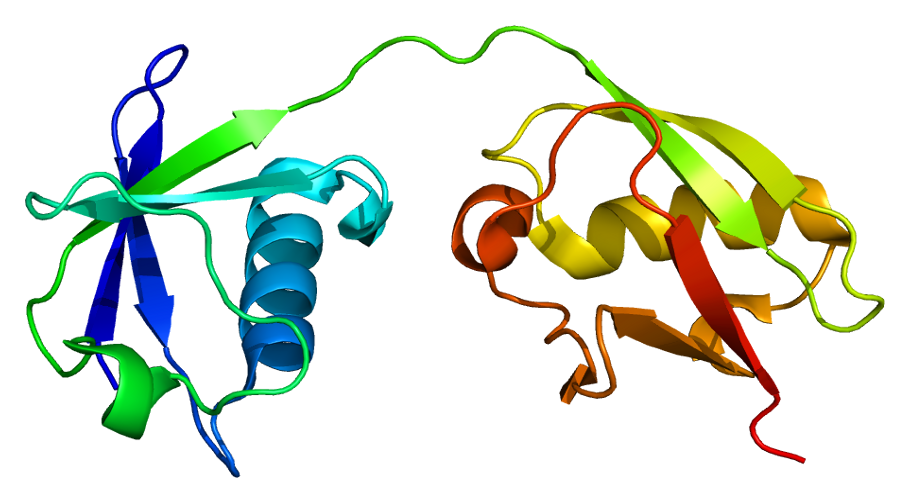

Identifiers
- Aliases: ISG15, G1P2, IFI15, IP17, UCRP, hUCRP, IMD38, ISG15 ubiquitin-like modifier, ISG15 ubiquitin like modifier
- External IDs: OMIM: 147571; MGI: 1855694; GeneCards: ISG15
Available structures
PDB	Ortholog search: PDBe RCSB
PDB	List of PDB id codes 1Z2M, 2HJ8, 3PHX, 3PSE, 3R66, 3RT3, 3SDL

Gene location (Human)
Chr.	Chromosome 1 (human)
Band	1p36.33	Start	1,001,138 bp
Band	1p36.33	End	1,014,540 bp

Gene location (Mouse)
Chr.	Chromosome 4 (mouse)
Band	4 E2|4	Start	156,283,912 bp
Band	4 E2|4	End	156,285,253 bp
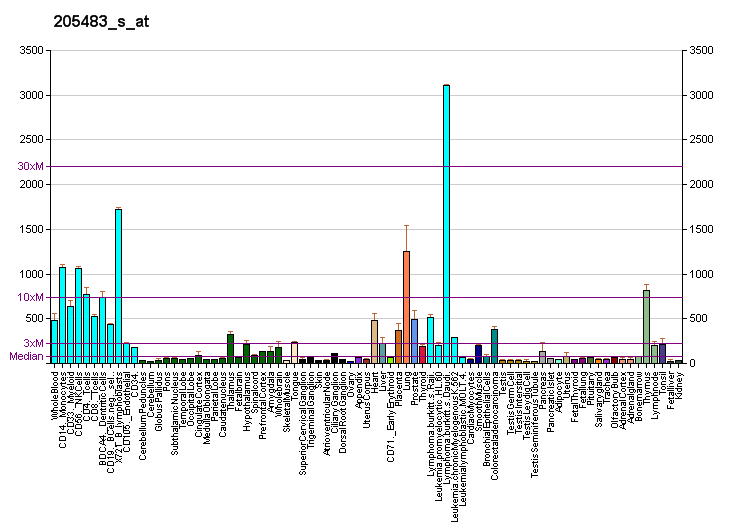
RNA expression pattern
Bgee	Human / Mouse (ortholog); Top expressed in: decidua; periodontal fiber; testicle; granulocyte; amniotic fluid; lateral nuclear group of thalamus; trigeminal ganglion; stromal cell of endometrium; monocyte; amygdala / Top expressed in: bone marrow; jejunum; granulocyte; placenta; colon; thymus; spleen; duodenum; ileum; esophagus; More reference expression data
BioGPS	More reference expression data
Gene ontology
Molecular function	protein binding; protein tag; integrin binding
Cellular component	cytoplasm; cytosol; nucleoplasm; extracellular region
Biological process	immune system process; regulation of interferon-gamma production; negative regulation of protein ubiquitination; negative regulation of viral genome replication; defense response to virus; type I interferon signaling pathway; response to type I interferon; translesion synthesis; negative regulation of type I interferon production; viral process; innate immune response; modification-dependent protein catabolic process; positive regulation of bone mineralization; ISG15-protein conjugation; defense response to bacterium; positive regulation of erythrocyte differentiation; response to bacterium; integrin-mediated signaling pathway
Sources:Amigo / QuickGO
Orthologs
Databases	NCBI: entry; OMA: entry
Species	Human	Mouse
Entrez	9636	100038882
Ensembl	ENSG00000187608	ENSMUSG00000035692
UniProt	P05161	Q64339
RefSeq (mRNA)	NM_005101	NM_015783
RefSeq (protein)	NP_005092	NP_056598
Location (UCSC)	Chr 1: 1 – 1.01 Mb	Chr 4: 156.28 – 156.29 Mb
PubMed search
- Wikidata
View/Edit Human	View/Edit Mouse

Interferon-stimulated gene 15 (ISG15) is a 17 kDa secreted protein that in humans is encoded by the ISG15 gene. ISG15 is induced by type I interferon (IFN) and serves many functions, acting both as an extracellular cytokine and an intracellular protein modifier. The precise functions are diverse and vary among species but include potentiation of Interferon gamma (IFN-II) production in lymphocytes, ubiquitin-like conjugation to newly-synthesized proteins and negative regulation of the IFN-I response.

== Structure ==
The ISG15 gene consists of two exons and encodes for a 17 kDa polypeptide. The immature polypeptide is cleaved at its carboxy terminus, generating a mature 15 kDa product that terminates with a LRLRGG motif, as found in ubiquitin. The tertiary structure of ISG15 also resembles ubiquitin, despite only ~30% sequence identity. Specifically, this structure consists of two ubiquitin-like domains connected by a polypeptide 'hinge'. Of note, ISG15 shows substantial sequence variation among species, with homology as low as 30% between orthologs.

== Function ==
After induction by type I interferon, ISG15 can be found in three forms, each with unique functions:

=== Extracellular cytokine ===
ISG15 is secreted from the cell and can be detected in supernatant or blood plasma. ISG15 binds the LFA-1 integrin receptor on NK- and T-cells to potentiate their production of IFN-II, which is essential for mycobacterial immunity.

=== Intracellular conjugate: ISGylation ===
In a ubiquitin-like fashion, ISG15 is covalently linked by its C-terminal LRLRGG motif to lysine residues on newly synthesized proteins. This process, termed ISGylation, is catalyzed by a series of conjugating enzymes. The activating E1 enzyme (UBE1L) charges ISG15 by forming a high-energy thiolester intermediate and transfers it to the UBE2E2 E2 enzyme. UBE2E2 has been identified as the major E2 for ISGylation, although it also functions in ubiquitination. The E2 protein subsequently transfers the ISG15 to specific E3 ligases (HERC5) and relevant intracellular substrates. Only one deconjugating protease with specificity to ISG15 has been identified to date: USP18 (a member of the USP family) cleaves ISG15-peptide fusions and also removes ISG15 (deISGylation) from native conjugates. The effects of ISGylation are incompletely understood and involve both activation and inhibition of antiviral immunity.

=== Free intracellular molecule ===
Unconjugated ISG15 negatively regulates IFN-I signaling by preventing the SKP2-mediated proteasomal degradation of USP18, a direct inhibitor of the IFN-I receptor. Absence of ISG15 leads to persistent IFN-I signaling in human, but not mouse, systems.

== Clinical significance ==
ISG15-deficiency is a very rare genetic disorder caused by mutations of the ISG15 gene. It is inherited with an autosomal recessive pattern and is classified as a primary immunodeficiency or inborn error of immunity. Patients present in childhood with infectious, neurologic or dermatologic features. Basal ganglia calcification is observed in all patients reported to date and represents the underlying autoinflammatory disease of excessive IFN-I activity, known as type I interferonopathy. The basal ganglia calcifications may cause epileptic seizures but often are asymptomatic. The IFN-I inflammation may also manifest early in life as ulcerative skin lesions in the armpit, groin and neck regions. Finally, ISG15-deficiency leads to mendelian susceptibility to mycobacterial disease, although with incomplete penetrance. These infections present as fistulizing lymphadenopathies and respiratory symptoms following BCG vaccination.
In pancreatic ductal adenocarcinoma, tumor-associated macrophages secrete ISG15 enhancing the phenotype of cancer stem cells in the tumor.

== History ==
ISG15 was originally identified in the late 1970s as a 15-kDa protein produced in response to type I interferon, a potent class of antiviral cytokines. Given the molecular weight, it was originally termed "a 15-kDa protein", but later renamed interferon-stimulated-gene-15 when the cassette of interferon-stimulated genes were recognized. In 1987 it was identified that ISG15 cross-reacts with anti-ubiquitin antibodies, and subsequent experiments uncovered the ubiquitin-like conjugation of ISG15 to other cellular proteins, coined "ISGylation". Given its inducibility by IFN-I, studies in the following decades focused on the antiviral activity of ISG15. These studies were carried out predominantly with in vitro systems and mouse models, and ascribed several antiviral functions to ISGylation. During this time, it was also discovered that ISG15 could be detected outside of cells. and in human serum samples. This free form of ISG15 could stimulate IFN-II production in lymphocytes. Finally, ISG15 could also be detected as an un-conjugated intracellular molecule with functions independent of ISGylation.

The discovery of humans deficient in ISG15 elucidated the importance of these functions in human biology. ISG15-deficient patients were first identified by their susceptibly to BCG-strain mycobacteria, owing to the essential function of free ISG15 to potentiate the IFN-gamma / Interleukin-12 axis Surprisingly, despite the IFN-inducible nature of ISG15 and the previously-ascribed antiviral functions in mice, ISG15-deficient patients showed no susceptibility to viral infections. In fact, follow-up studies uncovered enhanced type I IFN signatures, manifesting as basal ganglia calcifications akin to TORCH infection but without an infectious etiology. This persistent, low-level inflammation was later shown to confer enhanced resistance to a wide array of viruses. This phenotype results from a previously-unrecognized function of ISG15 to negatively regulate IFN signaling, which is absent in murine systems. Other higher-order mammals (e.g. pig and dog), however, have achieved this negative regulatory function of ISG15, seemingly by convergent evolution.
