= Erkki Ruoslahti =

Finnish and American cancer researcher

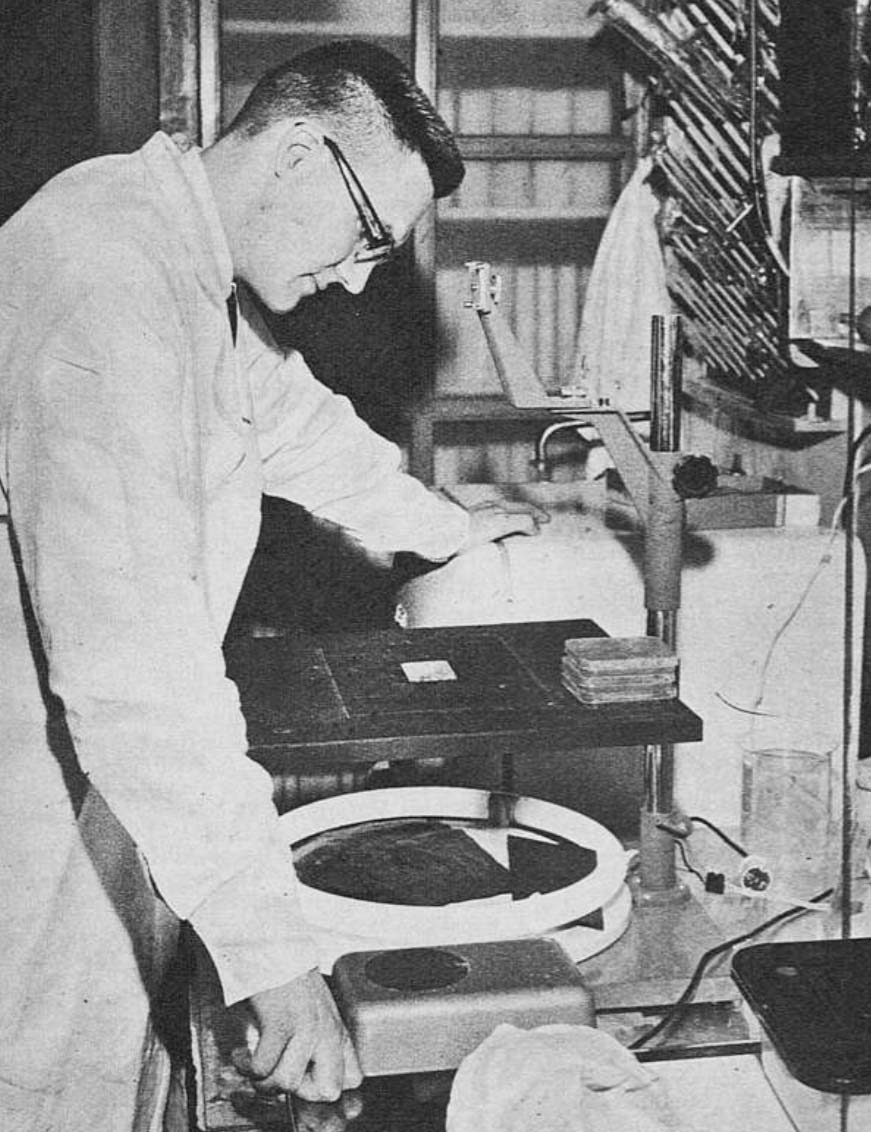
- Ruoslahti in 1965
- Born: 16 February 1940 (age 86); Imatra, Finland
- Citizenship: Finland; United States
- Education: University of Helsinki, Finland
- Known for: Work on cell adhesion and nanomedicine
- Awards: Robert J. and Claire Pasarow Foundation Medical Research Award (Cancer, 1990): G.H.A. Clowes Memorial Award, American Association for Cancer Research (1990); Nobel Fellow at the Karolinska Institutet, Stockholm (1995); Gairdner Foundation International Award (1997); Jacobaeus International Prize (1998); Jubilee Lecturer, Biochemical Society (2003); Japan Prize (Cell Biology, 2005); Thomson Reuters Citation Laureate (2012)
- Scientific career
- Fields: Cancer, tumor biology, vascular biology, neurodegeneration
- Workplaces: California Institute of Technology; University of Turku; City of Hope National Medical Center; Sanford Burnham Prebys Medical Discovery Institute

Erkki Ruoslahti (born 16 February 1940) is a Finnish and American cancer researcher. He is a distinguished professor at Sanford Burnham Prebys Medical Discovery Institute. He moved from Finland to the United States in 1976, and he has received U.S. citizenship.

Ruoslahti made seminal contributions to biology of extracellular matrix and its receptors. He was one of the discoverers of fibronectin, an adhesion molecule and component of extracellular matrices, and he subsequently identified and cloned a number of other extracellular matrix components and adhesion molecules. In 1984, he identified the sequence within fibronectin that mediates cell attachment, called RGD for the amino acids of which it's composed, and isolated the cellular receptors that bind that sequence, now known as integrins. The RGD discovery has led to the development of drugs for vascular thrombosis and cancer, among other diseases.

Ruoslahti currently studies specific marker molecules in blood vessels. He introduced the concept of vascular "zip codes," the idea that each tissue bears molecular signatures that can be targeted by affinity ligands, and used in vivo peptide phage display to prove the concept and develop numerous tumor-homing peptides.

== Early life and education ==
Ruoslahti was born in Imatra, Finland. He received his M.D. from the University of Helsinki in 1965 and his Ph.D. from the same institution in 1967. He completed postdoctoral studies at Caltech.

== Career ==
Ruoslahti held various academic appointments with the University of Helsinki and the University of Turku in Finland and City of Hope National Medical Center in Duarte, California until joining the La Jolla Cancer Research Foundation (now Sanford Burnham Prebys Medical Discovery Institute, or SBP) in 1979. He had moved from Finland to the United States in 1976. He served as SBP's president from 1989 to 2002, and was a distinguished professor at the University of California, Santa Barbara from 2005 to 2015. He has received U.S. citizenship.

== Recent work on homing peptides and nanomedicine ==
Ruoslahti's research group has developed a novel class of tumor-homing peptides that can be used to enhance delivery of drugs and nanoparticles to tumors. These tumor-penetrating peptides selectively home to tumor vessels, where they activate a transport pathway that delivers the peptide, and along with it drugs and even nanoparticles, through the wall of tumor blood vessels and deep into tumor tissue. Having bound to tumor vessels the peptide is cleaved and an amino acid sequence motif named the C-end rule or CendR motif (pronounced "sender") is exposed at the C-terminus of the peptide. Subsequent binding of the peptide to neuropilin-1 activates the CendR transport pathway into and through tumor tissue.

The prototype tumor-penetrating peptide, iRGD, is in clinical trials in solid tumor patients tested as an enhancer of cancer therapies. This peptide recognizes many different types of cancers, and it can be used for tumor delivery of various payloads that are either coupled to the peptide, or given together with it. iRGD has also been shown to effectively deliver drugs to the placenta, which could aid in the treatment of slow fetal growth.

Recently, in vivo phage screening has been used to identify peptides that target hypertensive pulmonary arteries, atherosclerosis, and diseases of the brain.

== Awards and honors ==
- 1990 - Robert J. and Claire Pasarow Foundation Medical Research Award
- 1990 - American Association for Cancer Research - G.H.A. Clowes Memorial Award
- 1991 - Honorary doctorate in medicine from Lund University, Sweden
- 1995 - Nobel Fellow at the Karolinska Institutet in Stockholm
- 1997 - Gairdner Foundation International Award
- 1998 - Jacobaeus International Prize
- 2003 - Jubilee Lecturer, Biochemical Society
- 2005 - Japan Prize in Cell Biology
- 2012 - Thomson Reuters Citation Laureate
- Knight of the Order of the White Rose of Finland
- Commander of the Order of the Lion of Finland
- 2022 - Albert Lasker Award for Basic Medical Research.
- 2023 - Fellow of the American Association for Cancer Research.
- Member of
  - National Academy of Sciences
  - National Academy of Medicine
  - American Academy of Arts and Sciences
  - European Molecular Biology Organization
