= Peptide biosensor =

Analytical technique in biology

A peptide biosensor is a type of biosensor that uses peptides or short amino acid fragments as the biorecognition element in detecting a specific analyte. The interaction of the peptide with the analyte generates a measurable signal (optical, electrical or mass-based) which is transformed by an appropriate transducer. Peptide biosensor exploits the affinity or ability of the peptide to bind to the target analyte such as proteins, nucleic acid, and metal ions.

Unlike the conventional biosensors that employ antibodies, enzymes, whole cells or polymers, peptide-based biosensors use short and specific peptide sequences that have high affinity to the analyte of interest. This technique provides higher stability, specificity, sensitivity, easier synthesis when compared to the traditional biosensors like enzyme-based and antibody-based.

Peptides can serve as an ideal substitute for protein as a biorecognition elements (receptor) in biosensors because they share identical chemical structure. They can be synthesized artificially via solid-phase synthesis to provide a specific sequence or screening library of peptides. Some peptide sequences are specific substrate for enzymes and are crucial for enzymatic assays and inhibitor screening

This type of biosensor has been increasingly used in medical diagnostics e.g., detection of cancer markers, pathogens, screening small molecule drug, food testing and bioprocess control. Their compatibility and adaptability with various signal transduction methods enables them valuable technique across research and industry

== Principle of operations ==
In peptide biosensors, peptides serve as the selective recognition element due to their amino acid sequence, which also accounts for their tailored binding affinity and specificity towards various analytes.

When the analyte interacts with the peptide recognition elements via non-covalent interactions, this interaction produces a change that can be transduced into a measurable signal. Peptides on their own cannot generate a quantifiable signal after binding events with the analytes, they must be bio-conjugated to signal markers. Common detection strategies include optical methods such as fluorescence resonance energy transfer (FRET), electrochemical outputs such as change in current, impedance, or potential, and sometimes mechanical or piezoelectric signals if the peptide-analyte binding alters mass or surface properties. These methods are commonly employed due to their sensitivity and compatibility with small peptide-based interfaces

== Types of peptide biosensors ==
Peptide biosensors can be classified based on both the signal transduction method and the nature of the biorecognition element employed for analyte detection.

=== Classification based on signal transduction method ===
==== Electrochemical peptide biosensors ====
Electrochemical peptide biosensors measure the electrical signals generated when a target molecule interact with an immobilized peptide. This interaction alter charge transfer, variation in impedance, voltage, current or potential at the electrode interface. Due to its high sensitivity, it is widely employed for point-of-care and field applications.

==== Optical peptide biosensors ====
In optical peptide biosensors, peptide-analyte binding events is converted into measurable optical changes. This depends on changes in fluorescence, luminescence, or absorbance upon analyte binding. The peptide sequence may be fluorescently labeled or monitored label-free through shifts in refractive index or optical density.

==== Mass-sensitive peptide biosensors ====
Mass-sensitive Peptide Biosensors make use of platforms like quartz crystal microbalance (QCM) or piezoelectric sensors. These biosensors detect changes in mass or resonance frequency upon target binding, providing a label-free detection in real time. Because they function label-free and are efficient in identifying cells, virion, poisons, and large biomacromolecules since the signal is directly dependent on mass accumulation.

==== Nanomaterial-based peptide biosensors ====
In this type of peptide biosensors, nanomaterials like gold particles, carbon nanotubules, graphene, or quantum dots improve sensitivity and signal strength. The nanomaterial interacts synergistically with the peptide to amplify electronic, optical, or mass-based signals. They are widely employed in ultra-sensitive detection of disease biomarkers and environmental toxins. this category a focal point of emerging biosensor designs.

=== Classification based on nature of biorecognition elements ===
==== Affinity-based peptide biosensors ====
This kind of peptide biosensor rely on peptides that can selectively bind a target like proteins, Small molecules, or ions. These peptides often mimic natural binding motifs, receptor fragments, antibody epitopes or ligand domains. They are engineered via methods such as phage display or computational design to achieve high affinity and specificity for their targets. These biosensors are widely used for detecting proteins, toxins and biomarkers due to affinity. Because affinity interactions offer great selectivity without requiring enzymatic reactions, these biosensors are frequently utilized for detecting proteins, toxins, and biomarkers.

==== Catalytic (enzyme-substrate) peptide biosensors ====
Some peptide biosensors employ peptides that act as substrates for specific enzymes such as Proteases and kinases. When the enzyme cleaves, modifies or phosphorylates the peptide substrate, the resulting structural change produces a measurable signal. Signal markers, commonly fluorescence or electrochemical output, can also be conjugated to the peptide substrate for more efficient measurable signal.

==== Metal ion peptide biosensors ====
Peptide sequence can serve as substitute for proteins in interacting with metallic ions since they share similar chemical structures. Certain peptide sequences exhibit high affinity for metal ions such as Zn²⁺, Cu²⁺, Pb²⁺, Hg²⁺, and Fe³⁺. This interaction can be utilized to design peptide-based sensors that can bind to metallic ions by conjugating the peptide sequence with signal markers

==== Nucleic acid and cell-binding peptide biosensors ====
Peptides can also be engineered to recognize and bind DNA, RNA or specific cell types. Peptides that bind nucleic acid may contain cationic or helix-forming motifs that promoite selective interaction, cell-binding peptides oftentimes mimic natural ligand sequences (e.g RGD peptides binding integrins).

These biosensors, which provide great selectivity while preserving structural stability, are employed in pathogen detection, cancer diagnostics, and cell profiling.
