= Toby Gibson =

British biochemist

- Born: Toby James Gibson
- Education: University of Edinburgh (BSc); University of Cambridge (PhD)
- Known for: Clustal
- Scientific career
- Fields: Computational biology Bioinformatics; Short linear motifs Protein interactions Sequence alignment
- Workplaces: Laboratory of Molecular Biology; European Molecular Biology Laboratory
- Thesis: Studies on the Epstein-Barr virus genome (1984)
- Website: www.embl.de/research/units/scb/gibson

Toby James Gibson is a group leader and biochemist at the European Molecular Biology Laboratory (EMBL) in Heidelberg known for his work on Clustal. According to Nature, Gibson's co-authored papers describing Clustal are among the top ten most highly cited scientific papers of all time.

== Education ==
Gibson was educated at the University of Edinburgh and went on to his PhD at the University of Cambridge in 1984 on the genome of the Epstein–Barr virus while working in the Medical Research Council (MRC) Laboratory of Molecular Biology (LMB).

== Career and research ==
Gibson was a postdoctoral research fellow with Sydney Brenner before moving to EMBL in 1986. He was appointed a staff scientist in 1991 and a team leader in 1996 where he has worked since.

Gibson’s research interests are in computational biology, bioinformatics, short linear motifs, protein–protein interactions and biological sequence alignment. His laboratory developed and hosts the Eukaryotic Linear Motif (ELM) resource.
