= Lisata Therapeutics =

Biopharmaceutical company in New Jersey, United States

- Company type: Public
- Traded as: Nasdaq: LSTA
- Industry: Biopharmaceuticals
- Headquarters: Basking Ridge, New Jersey, United States
- Key people: David J. Mazzo (CEO)
- Website: lisata.com

Lisata Therapeutics is an American clinical stage pharmaceutical company active in the field of oncology, specifically aimed at developing and commercializing new cancer therapies. It was formed through a merger of Cend Therapeutics and Caladrius Biosciences in September 2022.

In 2019, the FDA granted their product, certepetide (also known as iRGD and CEND-1), orphan drug status in pancreatic cancer, followed by a Fast track (FDA) status in 2022. Non-clinical data collected by Lisata and others have demonstrated enhanced delivery of various existing and emerging anti-cancer therapies, including chemotherapies, immunotherapies and RNA-based therapeutics when used with certepetide.
