= Minimotif Miner =

Content
- Description: database expansion and significantly improved reduction of false-positive predictions from consensus sequences.

Contact
- Laboratory: Sanguthevar Rajasekaran and Martin R. Schiller
- Authors: Mi, Tian; Merlin Jerlin Camilus, Deverasetty Sandeep, Gryk Michael R, Bill Travis J, Brooks Andrew W, Lee Logan Y, Rathnayake Viraj, Ross Christian A, Sargeant David P, Strong Christy L, Watts Paula, Rajasekaran Sanguthevar, Schiller Martin R
- Primary citation: Mi, Tian; Merlin Jerlin Camilus, Deverasetty Sandeep, Gryk Michael R, Bill Travis J, Brooks Andrew W, Lee Logan Y, Rathnayake Viraj, Ross Christian A, Sargeant David P, Strong Christy L, Watts Paula, Rajasekaran Sanguthevar, Schiller Martin R (2012)
- Release date: 2011

Access
- Website: http://mnm.engr.uconn.edu http://minimotifminer.org

Minimotif Miner is a program and database designed to identify minimotifs in any protein. Minimotifs are short, contiguous peptide sequences that are known to have a function in at least one protein. Minimotifs are also called sequence motifs or short linear motifs or SLiMs. These are generally restricted to one secondary structure element and are less than 15 amino acids in length.

== Description ==
Functions can be binding motifs that bind another macromolecule or small compound, that induce a covalent modification of minimotif, or are involved in the protein trafficking of the protein containing the minimotif. The basic premise of Minimotif Miner is that is a short peptide sequence is known to have a function in one protein, may have a similar function in another query protein. The current release of the MnM 3.0 database has ~300,000 minimotifs.

There are two workflows that are of interest to scientists that use Minimotif Miner:

1) Entering any query protein into Minimotif Miner returns a table with a list of minimotif sequence and functions that have a sequence pattern match with the protein query sequence. These provide potential new functions in the protein query.

2) By using the view single nucleotide polymorphism (SNP) function, SNPs from dbSNP are mapped in the sequence window. A user can select any set of the SNPs and then identify any minimotif that is introduced or eliminated by the SNP or mutation. This helps to identify minimotifs involved in generating organism diversity or those that may be associated with a disease.

Typical results of MnM predict more than 50 new minimotifs for a protein query. A major limitation in this type of analysis is that the low sequence complexity of short minimotifs produces false positive predictions where the sequence occurs in a protein by random chance and not because it contains the predicted function. MnM 3.0 introduces a library of advanced heuristics and filters, which enable vast reduction of false positive predictions. These filters use minimotif complexity, protein surface location, molecular processes, cellular processes, protein-protein interactions, and genetic interactions. These heuristics have recently been combined into a single, compound filter, making significant progress toward solving this problem with high accuracy of minimotif prediction as measured by a performance benchmarking study which evaluated both sensitivity and specificity.

== See also ==
- ELM resource
