= USP18 =

Protein-coding gene in the species Homo sapiens

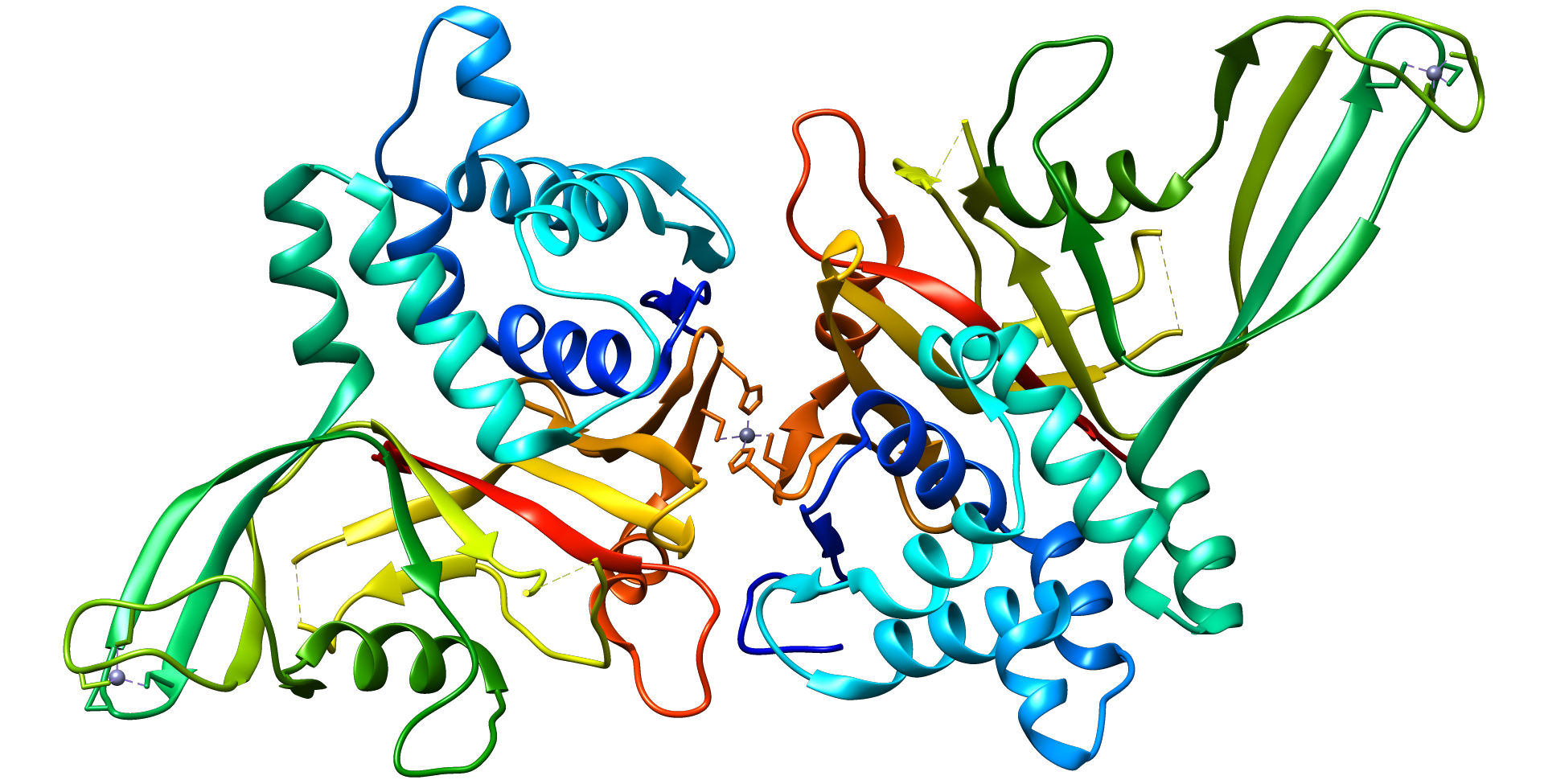

Identifiers
- Aliases: USP18, ISG43, UBP43, ubiquitin specific peptidase 18, PTORCH2
- External IDs: OMIM: 607057; MGI: 1344364; GeneCards: USP18
Available structures
PDB	Ortholog search: PDBe RCSB
PDB	List of PDB id codes 5CHT, 5CHV
Enzyme activity
EC #	BRENDA	ExPASy	KEGG	MetaCyc
3.4.19.12	↗	↗	↗	↗

Gene location (Human)
Chr.	Chromosome 22 (human)
Band	22q11.21	Start	18,150,170 bp
Band	22q11.21	End	18,177,397 bp

Gene location (Mouse)
Chr.	Chromosome 6 (mouse)
Band	6 F1|6 57.17 cM	Start	121,222,865 bp
Band	6 F1|6 57.17 cM	End	121,247,876 bp
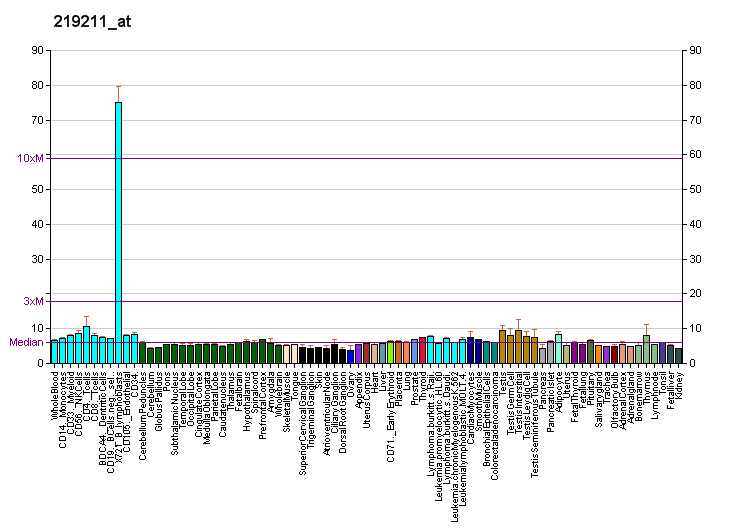
RNA expression pattern
Bgee	Human / Mouse (ortholog); Top expressed in: gonad; left testis; right testis; testicle; subcutaneous adipose tissue; liver; lymph node; right lobe of liver; islet of Langerhans; placenta / Top expressed in: mucous cell of stomach; transitional epithelium of urinary bladder; decidua; thymus; seminal vesicula; granulocyte; submandibular gland; mesenteric lymph nodes; lumbar spinal ganglion; islet of Langerhans; More reference expression data
BioGPS	More reference expression data
Gene ontology
Molecular function	peptidase activity; cysteine-type peptidase activity; protein binding; hydrolase activity; thiol-dependent deubiquitinase; ISG15-specific protease activity; cysteine-type endopeptidase activity
Cellular component	cytoplasm; nucleus; cytosol
Biological process	regulation of type I interferon-mediated signaling pathway; ubiquitin-dependent protein catabolic process; proteolysis; protein deubiquitination; regulation of inflammatory response; regulation of protein stability
Sources:Amigo / QuickGO
Orthologs
Databases	NCBI: entry; OMA: entry
Species	Human	Mouse
Entrez	11274	24110
Ensembl	ENSG00000184979	ENSMUSG00000030107
UniProt	Q9UMW8	Q9WTV6
RefSeq (mRNA)	NM_017414	NM_011909
RefSeq (protein)	NP_059110	NP_036039
Location (UCSC)	Chr 22: 18.15 – 18.18 Mb	Chr 6: 121.22 – 121.25 Mb
PubMed search
- Wikidata
View/Edit Human	View/Edit Mouse

Ubiquitin specific peptidase 18 (USP18), also known as UBP43, is a type I interferon receptor repressor and an isopeptidase. In humans, it is encoded by the USP18 gene. USP18 is induced by the immune response to type I and III interferons, and serves as a negative regulator of type I interferon, but not type III interferon. Loss of USP18 results in increased responsiveness to type I interferons and life-threatening autoinflammatory disease in humans due to the negative regulatory function of USP18 in interferon signal transduction. Independent of this activity, USP18 is also a member of the deubiquitinating protease family of enzymes. It is known to remove ISG15 conjugates from a broad range of protein substrates, a process known as deISGylation.

== Structure ==
The USP18 gene consists of 11 exons that encode a 43 kDa protein. The USP18 protein adopts the characteristic hand-like structure of ubiquitin-specific-proteases (USPs), which consists of a finger, palm and thumb domain. At the interface of the palm and thumb domain lies the catalytic site composed of the cysteine protease triad (cysteine, a histidine and an aspartate or asparagine). The C-terminus of USP18 is primarily responsible for negative regulation of interferon-I signaling.

== Function ==
Following its induction by type I interferons (IFN-Is), USP18 carries out three functional interactions:

=== Regulation of IFN-I signaling ===
USP18 inhibits IFN-I signaling by disrupting the receptor complex and the subsequent JAK-STAT signaling pathway. USP18 binds the IFN-receptor 2 subunit (IFNAR2), leading to the displacement of Janus kinase 1. and the dissociation of the cytokine-receptor complex. This process requires STAT2 to traffic USP18 to the receptor These events terminate signaling and draw cells into a refractory state with diminished sensitivity to future stimulation.

=== deISGylation ===
Using the isopeptidase domain, USP18 specifically deconjugates ISG15 (interferon-stimulated gene 15) from tagged proteins. This reaction is termed deISGylation, as the initial conjugation of ISG15 to newly synthesized proteins is termed ISGylation, a process akin to ubiquitination. However, unlike other de-ubiquitinating enzymes, USP18 is specific to ISG15, and exhibits no cross-reactivity with ubiquitin. The consequences of ISGylation and deISGylation are incompletely understood.

=== Stabilization ===
USP18 is stabilized by ISG15, but independently of the ubiquitin-like conjugation. Without ISG15-mediated stabilization, USP18 is degraded at the proteasome. This relationship exists in human, canine and porcine USP18/ISG15, but is absent in murine systems.

=== Promoting factor of HIV infection ===
Macrophages and dendritic cells are usually the first point of contact with pathogens, including lentiviruses. Host restriction factors, including SAMHD1, mediate the innate immune response against these viruses. However, HIV-1 has evolved to circumvent the innate immune response and establishes disseminated infection. It was reported that human USP18 is a novel factor potentially contributing to HIV replication by blocking the antiviral function of p21 in differentiated human myeloid cells. USP18 downregulates p21 protein expression, which correlates with upregulated intracellular dNTP levels and the antiviral inactive form of SAMHD1. Depletion of USP18 stabilizes p21 protein expression, which correlates with dephosphorylated SAMHD1 and a block to HIV-1 replication.

== Clinical significance ==
USP18-deficiency is a very rare primary immunodeficiency caused by mutations of the USP18 gene. The inheritance is autosomal recessive. The clinical disease presents in the perinatal period with life-threatening autoinflammation that mimics TORCH infections, but in the absence of infection. The severe inflammation results from a failure to regulate type I IFN activity, and is therefore considered a type I interferonopathy. This syndrome was initially described to result in death within weeks of birth. Fortunately, this previously lethal condition was recently demonstrated to be curable with a Janus kinase inhibitor and intensive supportive care.
