= Arginylglycylaspartic acid =

- Stereo, skeletal formula of arginylglycylaspartic acid

Names
- Systematic IUPAC name (2S)-2-{{#parsoidfragment:0}}2-{{#parsoidfragment:1}}(2S)-2-amino-5-(diaminomethylideneamino)pentanoyl]amino]acetyl]amino]butanedioic acid
- Other names L-Arginyl-Glycyl-L-Aspartic acid; Arg-Gly-Asp

Identifiers
CAS Number	99896-85-2
3D model (JSmol)	Interactive image
Abbreviations	RGD Peptide
ChEMBL	ChEMBL313763
ChemSpider	2575945; 94603
MeSH	arginyl-glycyl-aspartic+acid
PubChem CID	3328704; 104802
UNII	78VO7F77PN
CompTox Dashboard (EPA)	DTXSID30912420
- InChI: InChI=1S/C12H22N6O6/c13-6(2-1-3-16-12(14)15)10(22)17-5-8(19)18-7(11(23)24)4-9(20)21/h6-7H,1-5,13H2,(H,17,22)(H,18,19)(H,20,21)(H,23,24)(H4,14,15,16) Key: IYMAXBFPHPZYIK-UHFFFAOYSA-N
- SMILES: C(C[C@@H](C(=O)NCC(=O)N[C@@H](CC(=O)O)C(=O)O)N)CN=C(N)N

Properties
Chemical formula	C_{12}H_{22}N_{6}O_{6}
Molar mass	346.344 g·mol^{−1}
log P	−3.016
Acidity (pK_{a})	2.851
Basicity (pK_{b})	11.146
- Except where otherwise noted, data are given for materials in their standard state (at 25 °C [77 °F], 100 kPa). verify (what is ?) Infobox references

Arginylglycylaspartic acid (RGD) is the most common peptide motif responsible for cell adhesion to the extracellular matrix (ECM), found in species ranging from Drosophila to humans. Cell adhesion proteins called integrins recognize and bind to this sequence, which is found within many matrix proteins, including fibronectin, fibrinogen, vitronectin, osteopontin, and several other adhesive extracellular matrix proteins. The discovery of RGD and elucidation of how RGD binds to integrins has led to the development of a number of drugs and diagnostics, while the peptide itself is used ubiquitously in bioengineering. Depending on the application and the integrin targeted, RGD can be chemically modified or replaced by a similar peptide which promotes cell adhesion.

== Discovery ==
RGD was identified as the minimal recognition sequence within fibronectin required for cell attachment by Ruoslahti and Pierschbacher in the early 1980s. To do this, the authors synthesized various peptides based on the hypothesized cell attachment site of fibronectin. They then coupled those peptides to protein-coated plastic and tested each for cell attachment-promoting activity. Only those that contained the RGD sequence were found to enhance cell attachment. Further, they showed that peptides containing RGD were able to inhibit cell attachment to fibronectin-coated substrates, whereas peptides not containing RGD did not.

These foundational studies also identified the cellular receptors that recognize the sequence. These studies utilized a synthetic RGD-containing peptide to isolate the putative receptors, and then demonstrated that liposomes containing the isolated proteins could bind to fibronectin, in much the same way as cells with surface receptors. The discovered receptors were later named integrins. The RGD motif is presented in slightly different ways in different proteins, making it possible for the many RGD-binding integrins to selectively distinguish individual adhesion proteins.

== Use in drug discovery ==
Understanding of the molecular basis of binding to integrins has enabled the development of several drugs for cardiovascular disease and cancer, including eptifibatide, tirofiban and cilengitide. These drugs inhibit integrin binding. PET radiotracers such as fluciclatide utilize RGD-containing peptides to home to tumors, allowing for cancer monitoring.

=== Cardiovascular disease ===
Chemical structure of eptifibatide, a cyclic, RGD-mimetic antiplatelet drug

Eptifibatide and tirofiban are anti-clotting drugs indicated to prevent thrombosis in acute ischemic coronary syndromes. Eptifibatide is additionally FDA approved for patients undergoing percutaneous coronary intervention. These drugs block activation of the integrin responsible for aggregation of platelets (αIIbβ3, also known as glycoprotein IIb/IIIa) in response to the blood glycoproteins fibrinogen and von Willebrand factor. Eptifibatide (marketed as Integrilin) is a cyclic (circular) seven amino acid peptide, whereas tirofiban is a small molecule designed to mimic the chemistry and binding affinity of the RGD sequence.

=== Cancer ===
Cilengitide, a cyclic pentapeptide (RGDfV), is an investigational drug intended to block the growth of new blood vessels in tumors by interfering with the activation of integrin αVβ3. This integrin is upregulated in tumor and activated endothelial cells. This and other anti-angiogenic therapies depend on cutting off the blood supply to the tumor micro-environment, leading to hypoxia and necrosis. Cilengitide has been evaluated for the treatment of glioblastoma, but, as is the case for other anti-angiogenic therapies, has not been shown to alter progression or improve survival either alone or in combination with standard treatments.

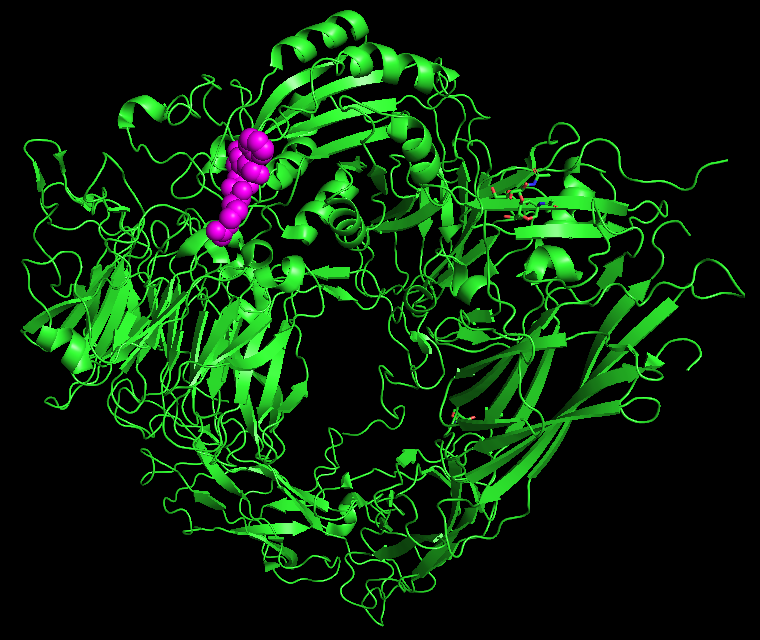
Crystal structure of an extracellular segment of integrin alphaVbeta3 complexed with a cyclic peptide containing the arginyl-glycyl-aspartic acid (RGD) sequence. RGD is shown in maroon.

CEND-1, also known as iRGD, is a cyclic peptide that homes to tumors via binding to integrin alpha V receptors. It also binds and activates neuropilin-1, leading to a temporary opening of the tumor and an enhanced delivery of anti-cancer agents into the tumor tissue. It is currently being tested in clinical trials in solid tumor patients.

=== Diagnostics ===
As anti-angiogenic cancer therapies have achieved widespread use, there has been increased interest in non-invasive monitoring of angiogenesis. One of the most extensively examined targets of angiogenesis is integrin αVβ3. Radiolabeled peptides containing RGD show high affinity and selectivity for integrin αVβ3 and are being investigated as tools to monitor treatment response of tumors via PET imaging. These include ^{18}F-Galacto-RGD, ^{18}F-Fluciclatide-RGD, ^{18}F-RGD-K5, ^{68}Ga-NOTA-RGD, ^{68}Ga-NOTA-PRGD2, ^{18}F-Alfatide, ^{18}F-Alfatide II, and ^{18}F-FPPRGD2. In a meta-analysis of studies using PET/CT in patients with cancer, it was shown that this diagnostic method may be very useful for detecting malignancies and predicting short-term outcomes, although larger-scale studies are needed.

== Use in bioengineering ==
RGD-based peptides have found many applications in biological research and medical devices. Culture plates coated with peptides mimicking ECM proteins' adhesion motifs, which promote prolonged culture of human embryonic stem cells, are on the market. RGD is also a universally used tool in the construction of multifunctional "smart" materials, such as tumor-targeted nanoparticles. Further, RGD is widely used in tissue engineering to promote tissue regeneration.

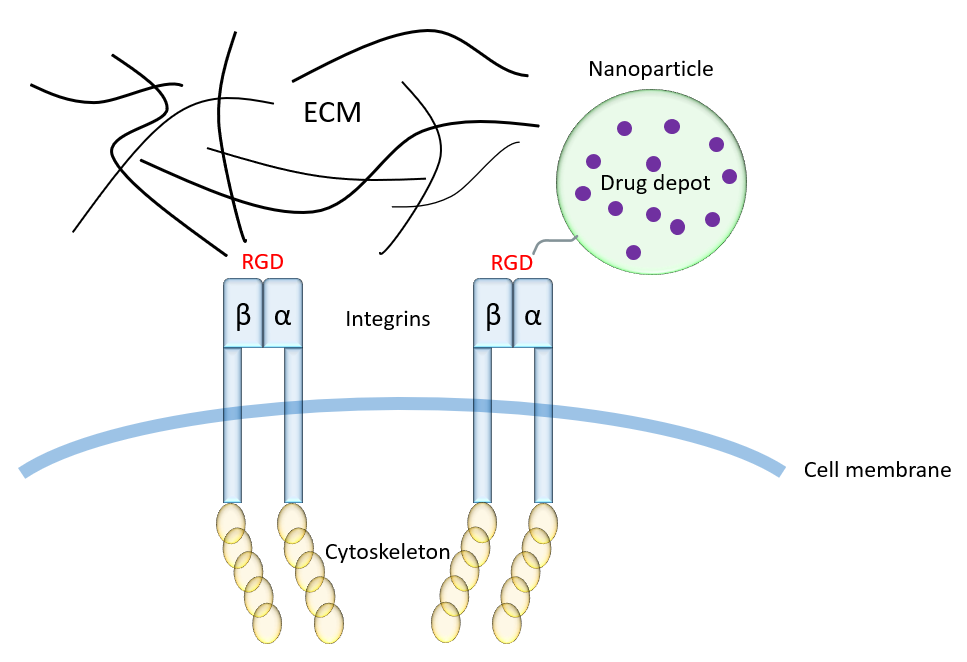
Illustration of an RGD-modified, drug-loaded nanoparticle binding to an integrin on the cell surface.

=== Drug delivery ===
Conventional drug delivery methods, such as systemic or topical delivery, are associated with many issues such as low solubility, off-target effects, and disadvantageous pharmacokinetics. Nanoparticles have been employed to increase solubility and target delivery of the drug to the desired tissue, increasing concentration of the drug at the site of action and decreasing drug concentration elsewhere, thereby increasing the efficacy of the drug and decreasing side effects. RGD has been employed to target nanoparticles containing drugs to specific cell types, especially cancer cells expressing integrin αvβ3.

Many research groups utilize RGD to target the chemotherapeutic doxorubicin to cancer cells. Like other chemotherapeutics of its class, doxorubicin causes hair loss, nausea, vomiting, and myelosuppression, and can lead to cardiomyopathy and congestive heart failure. Clinically available Doxil utilizes liposomes to reduce accumulation of doxorubicin in myocardial tissue, thereby reducing cardiotoxicity. However, such nanoparticles rely on passive targeting of tumors by the EPR effect, which varies by patient and tumor type. Active targeting strategies aim to increase drug transport into cells to improve efficacy and counter multidrug resistance.

In addition to doxorubicin, RGD-conjugated nanomaterials have been used to deliver the chemotherapeutics cisplatin, docetaxel, paclitaxel, 5-fluorouracil, and Gemcitabine to cancer cells. Such nanomaterials have also been used to deliver combination cytotoxic and vascular disrupting therapies.

=== Gene delivery ===
While gene therapy has gained significant attention from the medical community, especially for cancer therapy, a lack of safe and efficient gene delivery vectors has become a bottleneck to clinical translation. While viral vectors demonstrate high transfection efficiency and protect delivered genes, there are safety concerns associated with immune responses to the virus. Many nonviral vectors have been proposed, especially cationic lipids and polymers. However, these demonstrate low transfection efficiency compared to viruses. Therefore, RGD has been coupled to nonviral vectors to target delivery of genetic material to the desired cells, thereby increasing transfection efficiency.

=== Tissue engineering ===
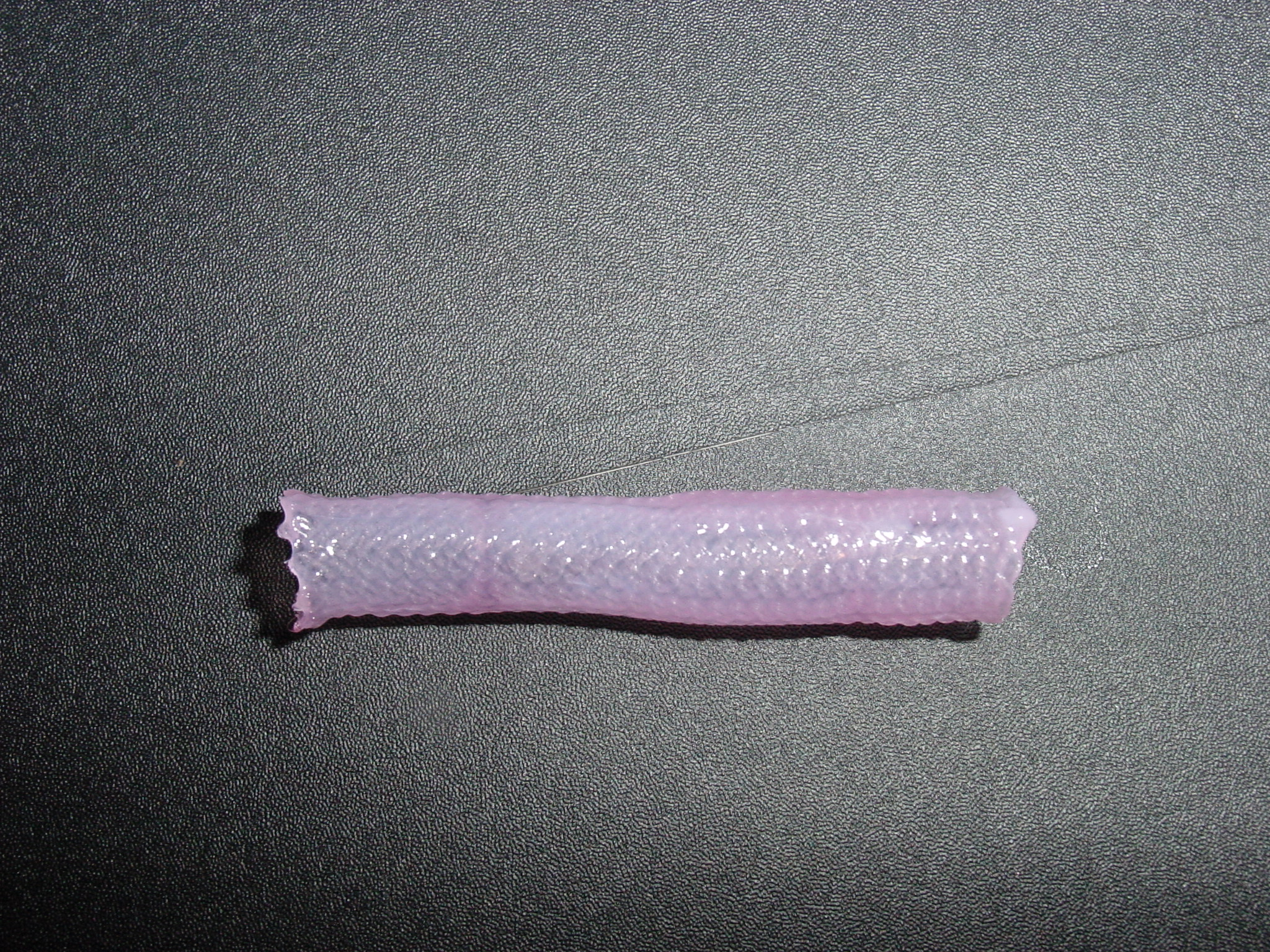
A tissue engineered vascular graft.

Tissue engineering aims to replace lost or damaged tissues within the body. The success of such efforts has depended greatly upon the ability to direct cell behavior and encourage regeneration of tissues. A key method of doing so utilizes ECM-derived ligands such as RGD to control cellular responses to a biomaterial, such as attachment, proliferation, and differentiation.

==== Vascular tissue ====
High rates of cardiovascular disease creates a high demand for grafts for vascular bypass surgery, especially small-diameter grafts which prevent occlusion. Modifying vascular tissue grafts with RGD has been shown to inhibit platelet adhesion, improve cell infiltration and enhance endothelialization. There have also been efforts to regenerate damaged heart tissues by applying cardiac patches following myocardial infarction. The addition of RGD onto a cardiac tissue scaffold has been shown to promote cell adhesion, prevent apoptosis and enhance tissue regeneration. RGD peptide has also been used to improve endothelial cell adhesion and proliferation on synthetic heart valves.

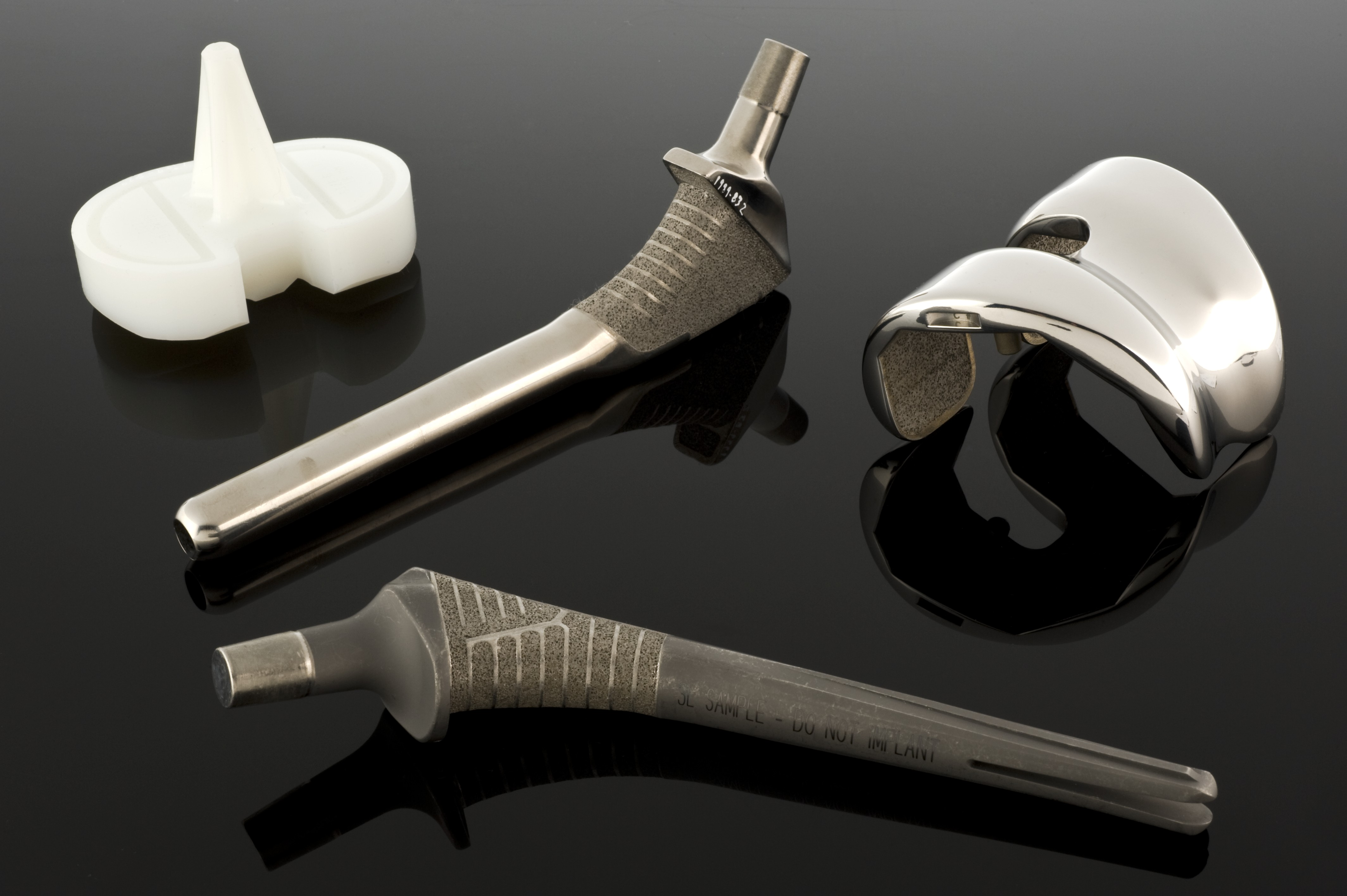
A titanium alloy hip joint replacement.

==== Bone tissue ====
Bone defects or fractures can occur in a number of ways, including trauma, neoplasm, osteoporosis, or congenital disorders. Treatments such as autografts or allografts suffer from lack of donor sites and chance of communicable disease, respectively. There is therefore considerable interest in developing tissue engineered bone constructs, which should encourage tissue regeneration. Coating an implant with RGD has been shown to improve bone cell adhesion, proliferation and survival. In vivo studies of such coatings additionally demonstrated improved osseointegration. Modifying a titanium implant surface with a protein containing RGD improved bone mineralization and implant integration and prevented failure of the prosthetic.

==== Eye tissue ====
Damage to the cornea causes significant vision impairment, the most common treatment for which is allograft cornea transplantation. However, donor corneal grafts are in short supply and, like other tissue grafts, carry the risk of rejection or communicable disease. Thus, tissue engineered options are desirable. In silk biomaterial scaffolds which replicate the hierarchical structure of the cornea, the addition of RGD improved cell attachment, alignment, proliferation, and ECM protein expression. Additionally, RGD has been used in regeneration of retinal pigmented epithelium. This tissue can be generated from human embryonic and induced pluripotent stem cells, however with inefficient differentiation. It has been shown that RGD-alginate hydrogels improve derivation of retinal tissue from stem cells.

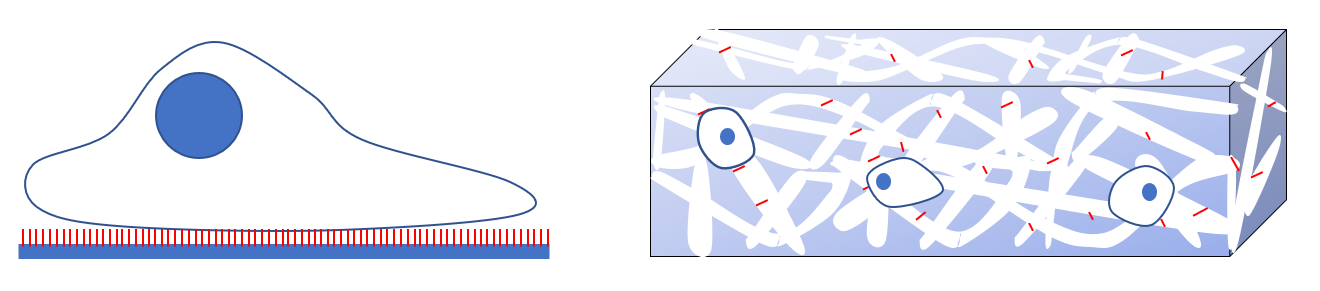
A cell on a 2D monolayer (left) and cells in a 3D hydrogel (right). Red bars represent RGD peptide.

==== Ligand presentation ====
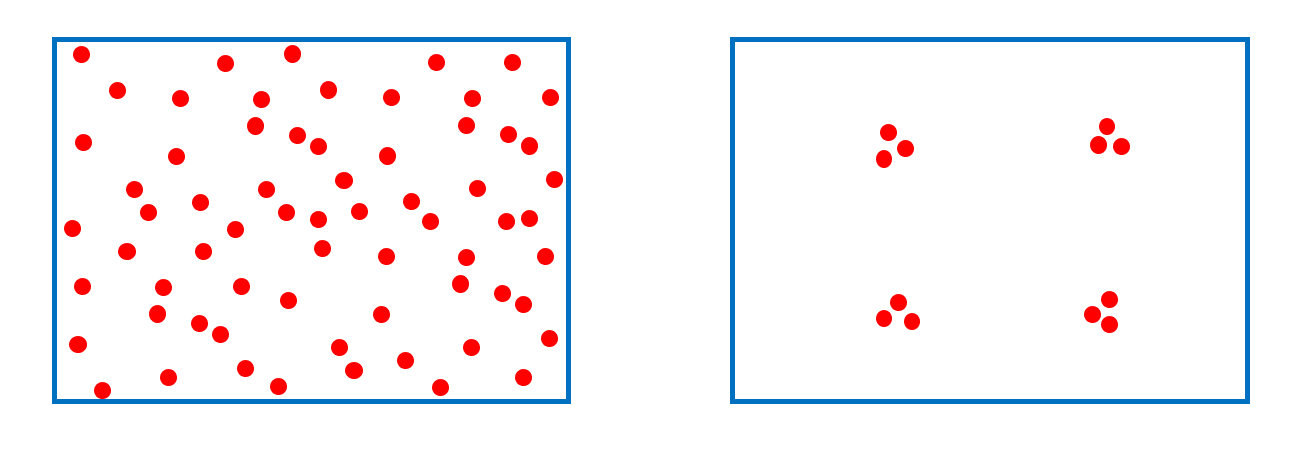
Global (left) and local (right) density. Local density of RGD peptides in a cell scaffold occurs on the micro/nano scales Red dots represent RGD peptide.

RGD and other bioactive ligands can be presented on the surface of a biomaterial in a number of different spatial arrangements, and it has been demonstrated that these arrangements have a significant impact on cell behavior. In self-assembled monolayers, it was found that adhesion and proliferation of both human umbilical vein endothelial cells (HUVECs) and human mesenchymal stem cells (MSCs) increased as a function of RGD peptide density. These studies also showed that RGD density could change integrin expression, which has been postulated to enable control of biochemical signaling pathways. Further investigation of MSCs on self-assembled monolayers showed that modulating RGD density and the affinity of RGD for αvβ3 (through use of linear and cyclized RGD) could be used to control the differentiation of MSCs. The effect of RGD presentation on cells in 3D biomaterials, which more accurately replicate the in vivo environment, has also been evaluated. In degradable polyethylene glycol hydrogels, the length of capillary-like structures formed by HUVECs was directly proportional to the density of RGD in the hydrogel. Additionally, studies in nano-patterning have shown that, whereas an increase in global RGD density increases cell adhesion strength until saturation, an increase in local (mico/nano-scale) RGD density does not follow this trend.

== Alternatives ==
RGD is the most widely used of a larger class of cell adhesive peptides. These short amino acid sequences are the minimum motif of a larger protein that is necessary for binding to a cell surface receptor that drives cell adhesion. The majority (89%) of published studies on biomaterials functionalized with cell adhesive peptides use RGD, whereas IKVAV and YIGSR are used in 6%, and 4% of those studies, respectively. Cell adhesive peptides isolated from fibronectin include RGD, RGDS, PHSRN, and REDV. YIGSR and IKVAV are isolated from laminin, whereas DGEA and GFOGER/GFPGER are isolated from collagen. Artificial amino acid sequences, which bear no biological similarity to ECM proteins, have also been synthesized, and include the α5β1-specific peptide RRETAWA.

Selected Cell Adhesive Peptides
Peptide	Source	Receptor Integrin	Major uses	References
RGD(S)	Fibronectin	α3β1, α5β1, α8β1, αvβ1, αvβ3, αvβ5, αvβ6, αIIbβ3	Promotes cell adhesion, targets tumors, used for drug discovery	,
PHSRN	Fibronectin	α5β1	Synergistic for cell adhesion when covalently attached to RGD	,
REDV	Fibronectin	α4β1	Promotes endothelial cell adhesion	,
YIGSR	Laminin	α4β1	Promotes cell adhesion, inhibits angiogenesis and tumor growth	,
IKVAV	Laminin	α3β1	Promotes cell adhesion and neurite outgrowth	,
DGEA	Collagen type I	α2β1	Inhibits adhesion of platelets or adenocarcinoma to collagen	,
GFOGER/GFPGER	Collagen type I	α1β1 and α2β1	Promotes osteogenesis in biomaterials	,
Eptifibatide	Derived from snake venom	αIIbβ3	Thrombosis inhibition	
RRETAWA	Synthetic	α5β1	Promotes endothelial cell adhesion without platelet adhesion	,

== Chemical modifications ==
Linear RGD peptides suffer from low binding affinity, rapid degradation by proteases, and lack of specificity for integrin type. RGD can be cyclized, or made into a cyclic compound, via disulfide, thioether, or rigid aromatic ring linkers. This leads to an increase in binding affinity and selectivity for integrin αVβ3 relative to αIIBβ3. For example, the cyclic peptide ACDCRGDCFCG, also known as RGD4C, was shown to be 200-fold more potent than commonly used linear RGD peptides. The structural rigidity of cyclic RGD peptides improves their binding properties and prevents degradation at the highly susceptible aspartic acid residue, thereby increasing their stability. Many RGD derivative drugs and diagnostics are cyclized, including Eptifibatide, Cilengitide, CEND-1, and ^{18}F-Galacto-RGD, and ^{18}F-Fluciclatide-RGD.
