= Eukaryotic Linear Motif resource =

ELM

Content
- Description: eukaryotic linear motifs.

Contact
- Authors: Holger Dinkel; Toby Gibson
- Primary citation: Dinkel & al. (2012)
- Release date: 2011

Access
- Website: elm.eu.org

The Eukaryotic Linear Motif (ELM) resource is a computational biology resource (developed at the European Molecular Biology Laboratory (EMBL)) for investigating short linear motifs (SLiMs) in eukaryotic proteins. It is currently the largest collection of linear motif classes with annotated and experimentally validated linear motif instances.

Linear motifs are specified as patterns using regular expression rules. These expressions are used in the ELM prediction pipeline which detects putative motif instances in protein sequences. To improve the predictive power, context-based rules and logical filters are being developed and applied to reduce the number of false positives matches.

As of 2010 ELM contained 146 different motifs that annotate more than 1300 experimentally determined instances within proteins. The current version of the ELM server provides filtering by cell compartment, phylogeny, globular domain clash (using the SMART/Pfam databases) and structure. In addition, both the known ELM instances and any positionally conserved matches in sequences similar to ELM instance sequences are identified and displayed.

== See also ==
- Phospho.ELM
- Minimotif miner
