= CendR =

CendR (C-end Rule) is a position-dependent protein motif that regulates cellular uptake and vascular permeability through interaction with neuropilin-1. The CendR motif has a consensus (R/K)XX(R/K) and it is able to interact with its receptor only when the second basic residue is exposed at the C-terminus.

== Mechanism of action ==
C-terminal CendR motif engages with widely expressed neuropilin-1 receptors to trigger an increased permeability of the vasculature and penetration of tissue parenchyma by an endocytotic/exocytotic transport mechanism. The CendR pathway starts with an endocytosis step that is distinct from known endocytosis pathways. It most closely resembles macropinocytosis, but unlike macropinocytosis, the CendR pathway is receptor (neuropilin)-initiated and its activity is controlled by the nutrient status of the cell or tissue. CendR is an active transport process that requires energy. It is not limited to extravasation, but also includes penetration of tissue parenchyma, potentially via cell-to-cell transport. CendR elements that are not C-terminally exposed are unable to bind to neuropilin-1. However, such cryptic CendR elements can be activated by proteolytic cleavage (e.g. by furin, urokinase type plasminogen activator, and other proteases of suitable substrate specificity).

== Clinical significance ==
The CendR pathway is used to enhance transport of coupled and co-administered anti-cancer drugs into tumors. Tumor penetrating peptides (TPP, a class of tumor homing peptides containing a cryptic CendR motif) activate tumor specific transport through a three-step process that involves binding to a primary tumor-specific receptor, a proteolytic activation of CendR element, and binding to NRP-1 to activate the trans-tissue transport pathway. Clinical-stage prototypic CendR peptide iRGD, developed by Lisata Therapeutics as LSTA1, is utilized to make solid tumors temporarily more accessible to circulating anti-cancer drugs to increase their therapeutic index. Several viruses, including the SARS-CoV2 coronavirus, are also using the CendR system for cellular entry and tissue penetration, and it is known that viruses that have the system are more virulent and deadly.
