= Cilengitide =

Names
- IUPAC name 2-[(2S,5R,8S,11S)-5-benzyl-11-{3-[(diaminomethylidene)amino]propyl}-7-methyl-3,6,9,12,15-pentaoxo-8-(propan-2-yl)-1,4,7,10,13-pentaazacyclopentadecan-2-yl]acetic acid

Identifiers
CAS Number	188968-51-6
3D model (JSmol)	Interactive image
ChEMBL	ChEMBL429876
ChemSpider	154046
IUPHAR/BPS	6597
KEGG	D03497
MeSH	Cilengitide
PubChem CID	176873
UNII	4EDF46E4GI
CompTox Dashboard (EPA)	DTXSID9044035
- InChI: InChI=1S/C27H40N8O7/c1-15(2)22-25(41)33-17(10-7-11-30-27(28)29)23(39)31-14-20(36)32-18(13-21(37)38)24(40)34-19(26(42)35(22)3)12-16-8-5-4-6-9-16/h4-6,8-9,15,17-19,22H,7,10-14H2,1-3H3,(H,31,39)(H,32,36)(H,33,41)(H,34,40)(H,37,38)(H4,28,29,30)/t17-,18-,19+,22-/m0/s1 Key: AMLYAMJWYAIXIA-VWNVYAMZSA-N; InChI=1/C27H40N8O7/c1-15(2)22-25(41)33-17(10-7-11-30-27(28)29)23(39)31-14-20(36)32-18(13-21(37)38)24(40)34-19(26(42)35(22)3)12-16-8-5-4-6-9-16/h4-6,8-9,15,17-19,22H,7,10-14H2,1-3H3,(H,31,39)(H,32,36)(H,33,41)(H,34,40)(H,37,38)(H4,28,29,30)/t17-,18-,19+,22-/m0/s1 Key: AMLYAMJWYAIXIA-VWNVYAMZBF
- SMILES: O=C1N[C@H](C(=O)NCC(=O)N[C@H](C(=O)N[C@@H](C(=O)N(C)[C@H]1C(C)C)Cc2ccccc2)CC(=O)O)CCC/N=C(\N)N

Properties
Chemical formula	C_{27}H_{40}N_{8}O_{7}
Molar mass	588.656 g/mol
Density	1.417 g/mL
- Except where otherwise noted, data are given for materials in their standard state (at 25 °C [77 °F], 100 kPa). verify (what is ?) Infobox references

Cilengitide (EMD 121974) is a molecule designed and synthesized at the Technical University of Munich in collaboration with Merck KGaA in Darmstadt. It is based on the cyclic peptide cyclo(-RGDfV-), which is selective for α_{v} integrins, which are important in angiogenesis (forming new blood vessels), and other aspects of tumor biology. Hence, it is under investigation for the treatment of glioblastoma, where it may act by inhibiting angiogenesis, and influencing tumor invasion and proliferation.

The European Medicines Agency has granted cilengitide orphan drug status.

Cilengitide seems to function by inhibiting the FAK/Src/AKT pathway and inducing apoptosis in endothelial cells. Preclinical studies in mice of cilengitide were able to demonstrate efficacious tumor regression.

In a rat xenograft model, cilengitide was able to potentiate the cytotoxic effects of radiation when cilengitide was administered prior to radiation therapy. When combined with radiation, inhibition of integrin expression by cilengitide synergistically improves the cytotoxic effects of ionizing radiation for glioblastoma.

== Clinical trials ==
Phase II studies were able to demonstrate that cilengitide as a potential monotherapy in patients with recurrent glioblastoma with high intratumor drug levels when 2000 mg of cilengitide is given twice weekly.

Cilengitide is well tolerated, in combination with radiation and temozolomide, at a dose of 2000 mg in patients with newly diagnosed glioblastoma, regardless of MGMT promoter status. In a phase I/IIa study, the addition of cilengitide to the standard of care for newly diagnosed glioblastoma (surgical resection followed by temozolomide and radiation therapy) improves progression-free survival and overall survival in patients with MGMT promoter methylation.

However, in a subsequent study, cilengitide does not seem to alter the pattern of glioblastoma progression, and in an EORTC phase III randomized, controlled, multicenter clinical trial, consisting of over 500 patients in 23 countries, the addition of cilengitide to the standard of care did not improve overall survival in patients with newly diagnosed glioblastoma and methylated MGMT promoter status In 2014, a phase II study, the CORE trial, was conducted in patients with newly diagnosed glioblastoma and unmethylated MGMT promoter status.
