= IRGD peptides =

Cyclic peptide

Clinical data
- Routes of administration: Intravenous

Pharmacokinetic data
- Bioavailability: 100%
- Metabolism: n/a
- Elimination half-life: 1-3 hours
- Duration of action: up to 24 hours
- Excretion: Renal (100%)

Identifiers
- CAS Number: 1392278-76-0
- PubChem CID: 134611625
- UNII: Z8MXU5GH4Q

Chemical and physical data
- Molar mass: (948.04 g/mol after conversion)

Internalizing RGD (iRGD) peptides are a class of 9-amino acid cyclic peptides containing an RGD sequence, which undergo internalization as discussed below. The prototypic iRGD peptide, shown in the image on the right (sequence: CRGDKGPDC; CAS 1392278-76-0), was originally identified in an in vivo screening of phage display libraries in tumor-bearing mice. The peptide was able to home to tumor tissues, but in contrast to standard RGD (arginylglycylaspartic acid) peptides, spread much more extensively into extravascular tumor tissue. It was later identified that this extravasation and transport through extravascular tumor tissue is due to the bifunctional action of the molecule: after the initial RGD-mediated tumor homing, another pharmacologic motif is able to manipulate tumor microenvironment, making it temporarily accessible to circulating drugs. This second step is mediated through specific secondary binding to neuropilin-1 receptor, and subsequent activation of a trans-tissue pathway, dubbed the C-end Rule, or CendR pathway.

== Mechanism of action ==
The iRGD peptide homes to and penetrates tumors through a 3-step process. First, the RGD sequence motif mediates binding to αVβ3 and αVβ5 integrins that are expressed on tumor endothelial cells. Second, upon αV binding, a protease cleavage event is activated, revealing the C-terminal CendR motif (R/KXXR/K) of the peptide. Third, the CendR motif is now able to bind to neuropilin-1, activating an endocytotic/exocytotic transport pathway. The pathway triggered by iRGD can be used for the enhanced transport of coupled and coadministered anti-cancer drugs into tumors.

== Uses ==
iRGD peptides have been shown to increase accumulation and penetration of anticancer drugs into tumors, but not into normal tissues – whether the drug is coupled to the peptide or given together with it. iRGD-mediated increased penetration and anti-cancer efficacy have been demonstrated with a variety of anti-cancer small molecules, nanoparticles and antibodies. Lisata Therapeutics Inc. is currently testing iRGD-based therapy called certepetide (aka LSTA1; CEND-1) in clinical studies in solid-tumor patients. The U.S. Food and Drug Administration (FDA) awarded certepetide orphan drug status in 2019, and fast-track designation in 2020.
