= UBE2E2 =

Protein-coding gene in the species Homo sapiens

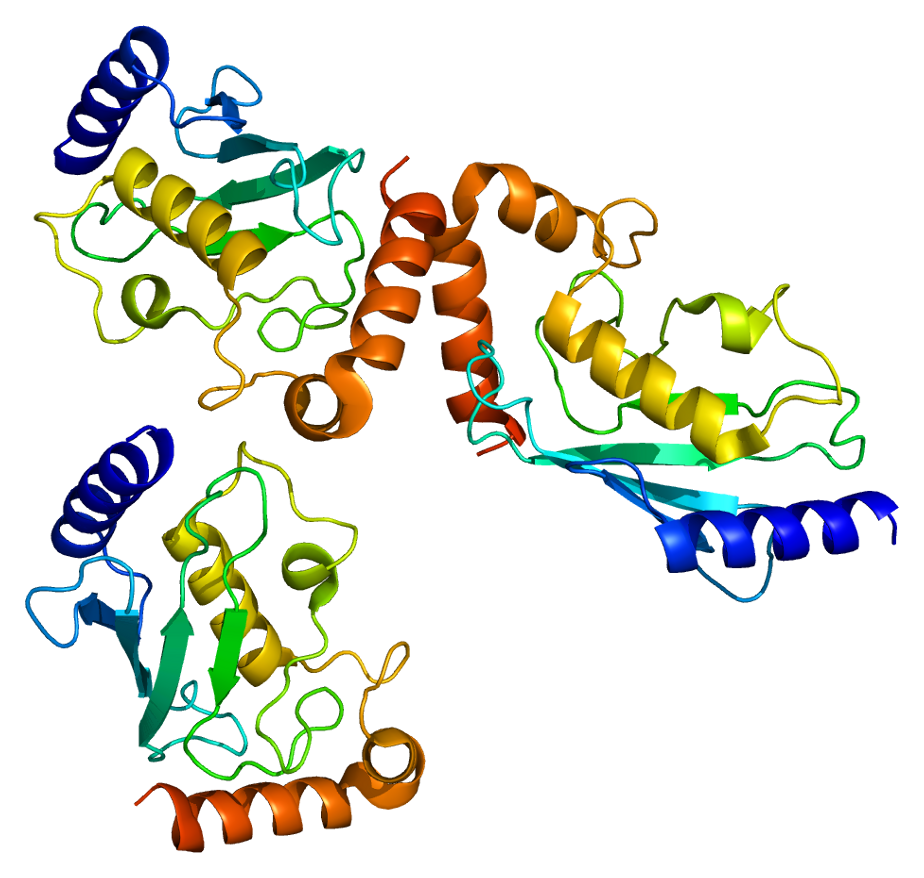

Identifiers
- Aliases: UBE2E2, UBCH8, ubiquitin conjugating enzyme E2 E2
- External IDs: OMIM: 602163; MGI: 2384997; GeneCards: UBE2E2
Available structures
PDB	Ortholog search: PDBe RCSB
PDB	List of PDB id codes 1Y6L
Enzyme activity
EC #	BRENDA	ExPASy	KEGG	MetaCyc
2.3.2.23	↗	↗	↗	↗

Gene location (Human)
Chr.	Chromosome 3 (human)
Band	3p24.3	Start	23,203,020 bp
Band	3p24.3	End	23,591,794 bp

Gene location (Mouse)
Chr.	Chromosome 14 (mouse)
Band	14|14 A1	Start	3,575,429 bp
Band	14|14 A1	End	3,896,121 bp
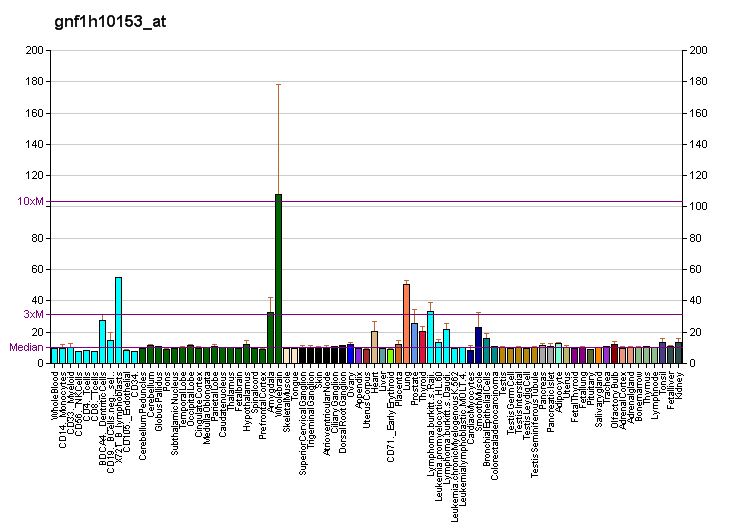
RNA expression pattern
Bgee	Human / Mouse (ortholog); Top expressed in: sural nerve; prefrontal cortex; popliteal artery; tibial arteries; Brodmann area 9; germinal epithelium; myocardium of left ventricle; cingulate gyrus; anterior cingulate cortex; right coronary artery / Top expressed in: dentate gyrus of hippocampal formation granule cell; motor neuron; Region I of hippocampus proper; hippocampus proper; fossa; visual cortex; barrel cortex; primary visual cortex; condyle; trigeminal ganglion; More reference expression data
BioGPS	More reference expression data
Orthologs
Databases	NCBI: entry; OMA: entry
Species	Human	Mouse
Entrez	7325	218793
Ensembl	ENSG00000182247	ENSMUSG00000058317
UniProt	Q96LR5	Q91W82
RefSeq (mRNA)	NM_152653; NM_001370225; NM_001370226; NM_001370227; NM_001370228	NM_144839; NM_001360327; NM_001360328
RefSeq (protein)	NP_689866; NP_001357154; NP_001357155; NP_001357156; NP_001357157	NP_659088; NP_001347256; NP_001347257
Location (UCSC)	Chr 3: 23.2 – 23.59 Mb	Chr 14: 3.58 – 3.9 Mb
PubMed search
- Wikidata
View/Edit Human	View/Edit Mouse

Ubiquitin-conjugating enzyme E2 E2 is a protein that in humans is encoded by the UBE2E2 gene.
