= Short linear motif =

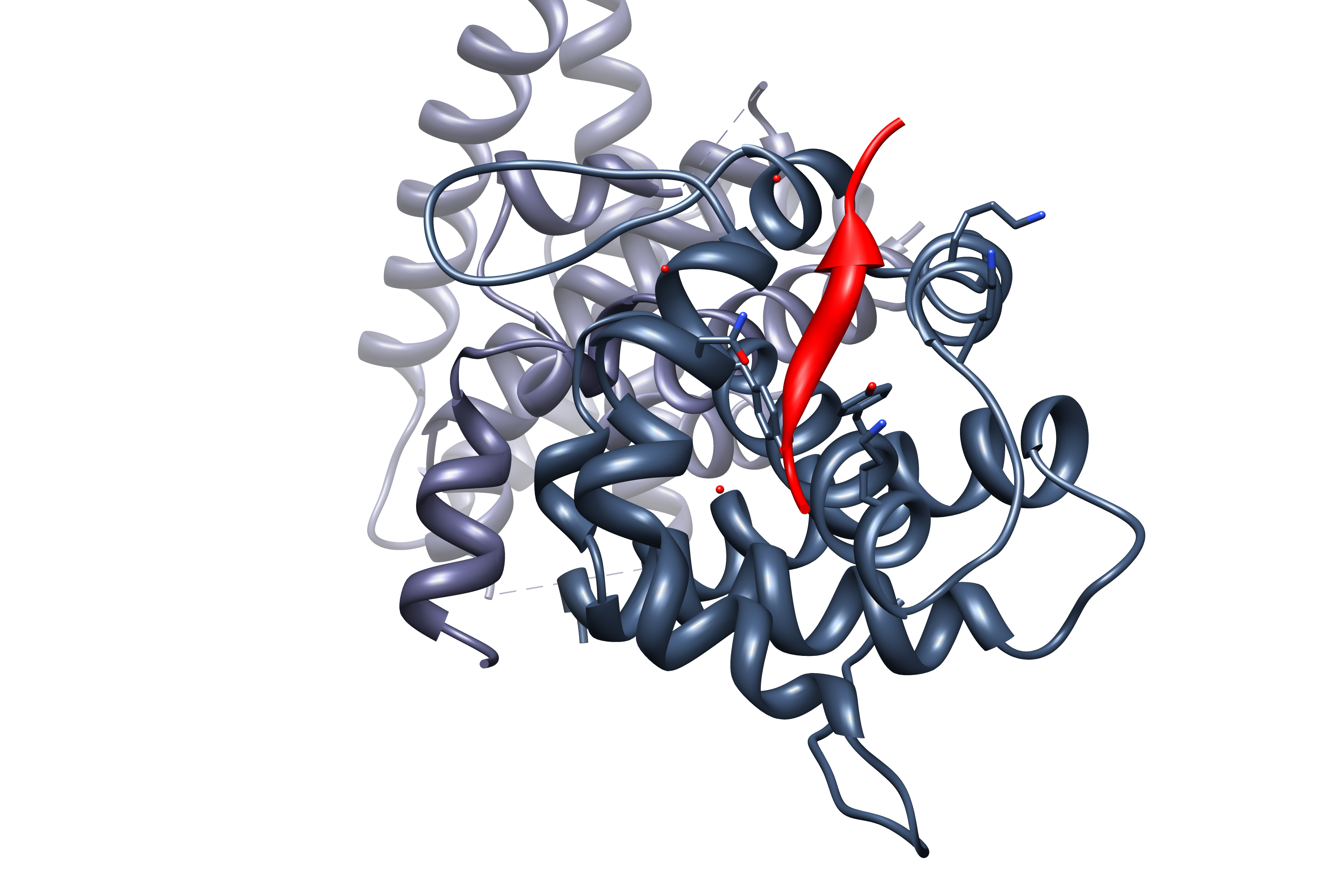
The human papilloma virus E7 oncoprotein mimic of the LxCxE motif (red) bound to the host retinoblastoma protein (dark grey) (PDB: 1gux)

In molecular biology short linear motifs (SLiMs), linear motifs or minimotifs are short stretches of protein sequence that mediate protein–protein interaction.

The first definition was given by Tim Hunt:

"The sequences of many proteins contain short, conserved motifs that are involved in recognition and targeting activities, often separate from other functional properties of the molecule in which they occur. These motifs are linear, in the sense that three-dimensional organization is not required to bring distant segments of the molecule together to make the recognizable unit. The conservation of these motifs varies: some are highly conserved while others, for example, allow substitutions that retain only a certain pattern of charge across the motif."

== Attributes ==
SLiMs are generally situated in intrinsically disordered regions (over 80% of known SLiMs), however, upon interaction with a structured partner, secondary structure is often induced. The majority of annotated SLiMs consist of 3 to 11 contiguous amino acids, with an average of just over 6 residues. However, only few hotspot residues (on average 1 hotspot for each 3 residues in the motif) contribute the majority of the free energy of binding and determine most of the affinity and specificity of the interaction. Although most motifs have no positional preference, several of them are required to be localized at the protein termini in order to be functional. The key defining attribute of SLiMs, having a limited number of residues that directly contact the binding partner, has two major consequences. First, only few or even a single mutation can result in the generation of a functional motif, with further mutations of flanking residues allowing tuning affinity and specificity. This results in SLiMs having an increased propensity to evolve convergently, which facilitates their proliferation, as is evidenced by their conservation and increased incidence in higher Eukaryotes. It has been hypothesized that this might increase and restructure the connectivity of the interactome. Second, SLiMs have relatively low affinity for their interaction partners (generally between 1 and 150 μM), which makes these interactions transient and reversible, and thus ideal to mediate dynamic processes such as cell signaling. In addition, this means that these interactions can be easily modulated by post-translational modifications that change the structural and physicochemical properties of the motif. Also, regions of high functional density can mediate molecular switching by means of overlapping motifs (e.g. the C-terminal tails of integrin beta subunits), or they can allow high avidity interactions by multiple low affinity motifs (e.g. multiple AP2-binding motifs in Eps15).

== Function ==
SLiM functions in almost every pathway due to their critical role in regulatory function, protein-protein interaction and signal transduction. SLiM act as interaction modules that are recognised by additional biomolecules. The majority of known interaction partners of SLiMs are globular protein domains, though, SLiMs that recognise other intrinsically disordered regions, RNA and lipids have also been characterised. SLiMs can be broadly split into two high level classes, modification sites and ligand binding sites.

Modification sites
Modification sites SLiMs encompass sites with intrinsic specificity determinant that are recognised and modified by the active site of a catalytic domain of an enzyme. These SLiMs include many classical post translational modification sites (PTMs), proteolytic cleavage sites recognised by proteases and bonds recognised by isomerases.

- Moiety addition – SLiMs are often targeted for the addition of a small chemical groups (e.g. Phosphorylation), proteins (e.g. SUMOylation) or other moieties (e.g. post translational moiety addition).
- Proteolytic cleavage -SLiMs can act as recognition sites of endo-peptidases resulting in the irreversible cleavage of the peptide at the SLiM.
- Structural modifications – SLiMs can be recognised by isomerases resulting in the cis-trans isomerisation of the peptide backbone.

Ligand binding sites
Ligand binding site SLiMs recruit binding partners to the SLiM containing proteins, often mediating transient interactions, or acting co-operatively to produce more stable complexes. Ligand SLiMs are often central to the formation of dynamic multi-protein complexes, however, they more commonly mediate regulatory interactions that control the stability, localisation or modification state of a protein.

- Complex formation – Ligand SLiMs often function as simple interfaces that recruit proteins to multi-protein complexes (e.g. the Retinoblastoma-binding LxCxE motif) or act as aggregators in scaffold proteins (e.g. SH3 domain-binding proline-rich sequences).
- Localisation – A large number of SLiMs act as zipcodes that are recognized by the cellular transport machinery mediating the relocalisation of the containing protein to the correct sub-cellular compartment (e.g. Nuclear localisation signals (NLSs) and Nuclear export signals (NESs))
- Modification state – Many classes of ligand SLiMs recruit enzymes to their substrate by binding to sites that are distinct from the enzyme's active site. These site, known as docking motifs, act as additional specificity determinants for these enzymes and decrease the likelihood of off-target modification events.
- Stability – A subset of docking motifs recruit E3 ubiquitin ligase to their substrates. The resulting polyubiquitination targets the substrate for proteosomal destruction.

== Role in disease ==
Disordered protein elements like SLiMs are frequently found in factors that regulate gene expression. As a result, several diseases have been linked to mutations that alter key SLiM-mediated functions. For instance, one cause of Noonan Syndrome is a mutation in the protein Raf-1 which abrogates the interaction with 14-3-3 proteins mediated by corresponding short linear motifs and thereby deregulate the Raf-1 kinase activity. Usher's Syndrome is the most frequent cause of hereditary deaf-blindness in humans and can be caused by mutations in either PDZ domains in Harmonin or the corresponding PDZ interaction motifs in the SANS protein. Finally, Liddle's Syndrome has been implicated with autosomal dominant activating mutations in the WW interaction motif in the β-(SCNNB_HUMA) and γ-(SCNNG_HUMA) subunits of the Epithelial sodium channel ENaC. These mutations abrogate the binding to the ubiquitin ligase NEDD4, thereby inhibiting channel degradation and prolonging the half-life of ENaC, ultimately resulting in increased Na^{+} reabsorption, plasma volume extension and hypertension.

Viruses often mimic human SLiMs to hijack and disrupt a host's cellular machinery, thereby adding functionality to their compact genomes without necessitating new virally encoded proteins. In fact, many motifs were originally discovered in viruses, such as the Retinoblastoma binding LxCxE motif and the UEV domain binding PTAP late domain. The short generation times and high mutation rates of viruses, in association with natural selection, has led to multiple examples of mimicry of host SLiMs in every step of the viral life cycle (Src binding motif PxxP in Nef modulates replication, WW domain binding PPxY mediates budding in Ebola virus, A Dynein Light Chain binding motif in Rabies virus is vital for host infection). The YGL motif (Tyrosine-Glycine-Leucine) is an integrin-binding motif present in several viral glycoproteins including Equine Herpes Virus (EHV) 1, EHV-4, and in rotavirus VP4. The extent of human SLiM mimicry is surprising with many viral proteins containing several functional SLiMs, for example, the Adenovirus protein E1A.

Pathogenic bacteria also mimic host motifs (as well as having their own motifs), however, not to the same extent as the obligate parasite viruses. E. Coli injects a protein, EspF(U), that mimics an autoinhibitory element of N-WASP into the host cell to activate actin-nucleating factors WASP. The KDEL motif of the bacteria encoded cholera toxin mediates cell entry of the cholera toxin.

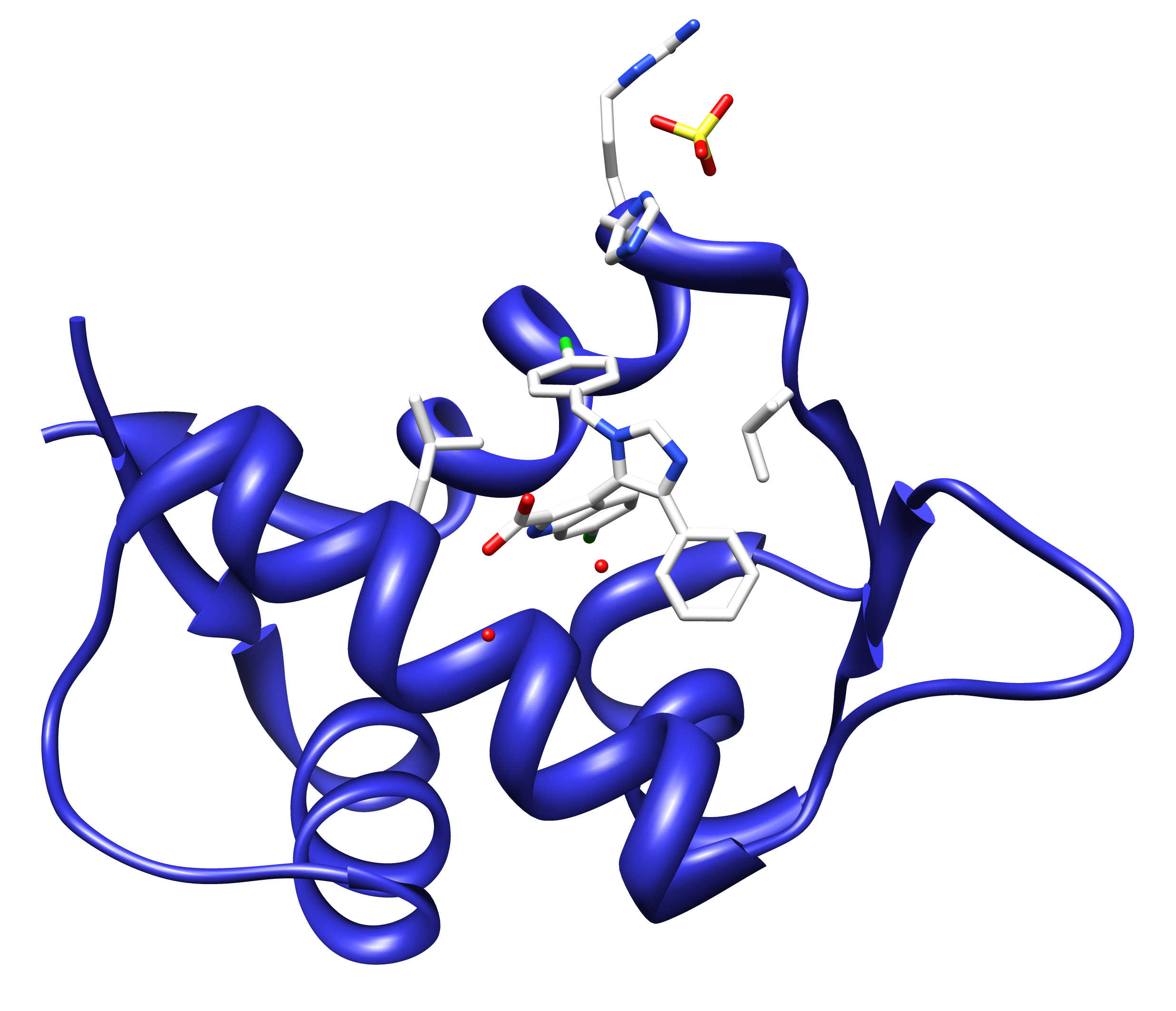
MDM2 SWIB domain-binding motif mimic drug Nutlin bound to MDM2(PDB: 3lbk)

== Potential as leads for drug design ==
Linear motif mediated protein-protein interactions have shown promise in recent years as novel drug targets. Success stories include the MDM2 motif analog Nutlin-3 and integrin targeting RGD-mimetic Cilengitide: Nutlin-3 antagonises the interaction of MDM2's SWIB domain with p53 thus stabilising p53 and inducing senescence in cancer cells. Cilengitide inhibits integrin-dependent signaling, causing the disassembly of cytoskeleton, cellular detachment and the induction of apoptosis in endothelial and glioma cells. In addition, peptides targeting the Grb2 and Crk SH2/ SH3 adaptor domains are also under investigation.

There are at present no drugs on the market specially targeting phosphorylation sites, however, a number of drugs target the kinase domain. This tactic has shown promise in the treatments of various forms of cancer. For example, Stutnet® is a receptor tyrosine kinase (RTK) inhibitor for treating gastrointestinal cancer, Gleevec® specially targets bcr-abl and Sprycel® is a broad-based tyrosine kinase inhibitor whose targets include Bcr-Abl and Src. Cleavage is another process directed by motif recognition with the proteases responsible for cleavage a good drug target. For example, Tritace®, Vasotec®, Accupril®, and Lotensin® are substrate mimetic Angiotensin converting enzymes inhibitors. Other drugs that target post-translational modifications include Zovirax®, an antiviral myristoylation inhibitor and Farnysyl Transferase inhibitors that block the lipidation modification to a CAAX-box motif.

Recommended further reading:

== Computational motif resources ==
=== Databases ===
SLiMs are usually described by regular expressions in the motif literature with the important residues defined based on a combination of experimental, structural and evolutionary evidence. However, high throughput screening such as phage display has seen a large increase in the available information for many motifs classes allowing them to be described with sequence logos. Several diverse repositories currently curate the available motif data. In terms of scope, the Eukaryotic Linear Motif resource (ELM) and MiniMotif Miner (MnM) represent the two largest motif databases as they attempt to capture all motifs from the available literature. Several more specific and specialised databases also exist, PepCyber and ScanSite focus on smaller subsets of motifs, phosphopeptide binding and important signaling domains respectively. PDZBase focuses solely on PDZ domain ligands. MEROPS and CutDB curate available proteolytic event data including protease specificity and cleavage sites. There has been a large increase in the number of publications describing motif mediated interactions over past decade and as a result a large amount of the available literature remains to be curated. Recent work has created the tool MiMosa to expedite the annotation process and encourage semantically robust motif descriptions.

=== Discovery tools ===
SLiMs are short and degenerate and as a result the proteome is littered with stochastically occurring peptides that resemble functional motifs. The biologically relevant cellular partners can easily distinguish functional motifs, however computational tools have yet to reach a level of sophistication where motif discovery can be accomplished with high success rates.

Motif discovery tools can be split into two major categories, discovery of novel instance of known functional motifs class and discovery of functional motifs class, however, they all use a limited and overlapping set of attributes to discriminate true and false positives. The main discrimatory attributes used in motif discovery are:

- Accessibility – the motif must be accessible for the binding partner. Intrinsic disorder prediction tools (such as IUPred or GlobPlot), domain databases (such as Pfam and SMART) and experimentally derived structural data (from sources such as PDB) can be used to check the accessibility of predicted motif instances.
- Conservation – the conservation of a motif correlates strongly with functionality and many experimental motifs are seen as islands of strong constraint in regions of weak conservation. Alignment of homologous proteins can be used to calculate conservation metric for a motif.
- Physicochemical properties – Certain intrinsic properties of residues or stretches of amino acids are strong discriminators of functionality, for example, the propensity of a region of disorder to undergo a disorder to order transition.
- Enrichment in groupings of similar proteins – Motif often evolve convergently to carry out similar tasks in different proteins such as mediating binding to a specific partner or targeting proteins to a particular subcellular localisation. Often in such cases these grouping the motif occurs more often than is expected by chance and can be detected by searching for enriched motifs.

==== Novel functional motifs instances ====
The Eukaryotic Linear Motif resource (ELM) and MiniMotif Miner (MnM) both provide servers to search for novel instance of known functional motifs in protein sequences. SLiMSearch allows similar searches on a proteome-wide scale.

==== Novel functional motifs class ====
More recently computational methods have been developed that can identify new Short Linear Motifs de novo. Interactome-based tools rely on identifying a set of proteins that are likely to share a common function, such as binding the same protein or being cleaved by the same peptidase. Two examples of such software are DILIMOT and SLiMFinder. Anchor and α-MoRF-Pred use physicochemical properties to search for motif-like peptides in disordered regions (termed MoRFs, among others). ANCHOR identifies stretches of intrinsically disordered regions that cannot form favorable intrachain interactions to fold without additional stabilising energy contributed by a globular interaction partner. α-MoRF-Pred uses the inherent propensity of many SLiM to undergo a disorder to order transition upon binding to discover α-helical forming stretches within disordered regions. MoRFPred and MoRFchibi SYSTEM are SVM based predictors which utilize multiple features including local sequence physicochemical properties, long stretches of disordered regions and conservation in their predictions. SLiMPred is neural network–based method for the de novo discovery of SLiMs from the protein sequence. Information about the structural context of the motif (predicted secondary structure, structural motifs, solvent accessibility, and disorder) are used during the predictive process. Importantly, no previous knowledge about the protein (i.e., no evolutionary or experimental information) is required.
